The Cotswold Way is a  long-distance footpath, running along the Cotswold Edge escarpment of the Cotswold Hills in England. It was officially  inaugurated as a National Trail on 24 May 2007 and several new rights of way have been created.

History
The Cotswold Way route was first suggested some 50 years ago by Gloucestershire-area Ramblers, of which Tony Drake (d. 7 March 2012) of Cheltenham area and the late Cyril Trenfield of the South Gloucestershire area were principals. Although recognised as a suitable route for a National Trail in due course, the path was initially sponsored by Gloucestershire County Council, who had no powers of footpath creation, and so used only existing rights of way.

An early guide to the Way, in the hand-drawn pictorial style of Alfred Wainwright, was produced by another Cheltenham-area rambler, Mark Richards, in 1973. The foreword from Tony Drake says:{"type":"FeatureCollection","features":[{"type":"Feature","properties":{"stroke": "#ff0000","stroke-width": 1},"geometry":{"type":"LineString","coordinates":[[-1.7809075,52.0507209],[-1.7810404,52.0506776],[-1.7811462,52.0506587],[-1.7813079,52.0506064],[-1.7815311,52.0505469],[-1.7817954,52.0504758],[-1.7821372,52.0503603],[-1.7821372,52.0503603],[-1.7825517,52.0501952],[-1.7827204,52.0500907],[-1.7828945,52.0499784],[-1.7831062,52.0498368],[-1.7830179,52.0497561],[-1.7832296,52.0496687],[-1.7836537,52.0494898],[-1.7840817,52.0493275],[-1.7847432,52.0492071],[-1.7849943,52.0493258],[-1.785471,52.0496276],[-1.7858572,52.0499774],[-1.7858765,52.0500138],[-1.7858758,52.0500568],[-1.7858389,52.0501062],[-1.7858872,52.05022],[-1.7859204,52.0503048],[-1.7859676,52.0503586],[-1.7860435,52.0504112],[-1.7865904,52.0506467],[-1.7869717,52.05078],[-1.7871146,52.05083],[-1.7876442,52.0510566],[-1.7877519,52.0511128],[-1.7881842,52.0515531],[-1.7882582,52.0516284],[-1.7883196,52.0516909],[-1.7884327,52.0518529],[-1.7885986,52.0520903],[-1.7887232,52.0522456],[-1.7888723,52.0524314],[-1.7893236,52.0529],[-1.7894355,52.0530233],[-1.7896018,52.0531361],[-1.79009,52.053556],[-1.7905191,52.0538841],[-1.7908265,52.0543785],[-1.7912,52.0546911],[-1.7919122,52.0551862],[-1.7923437,52.055419],[-1.7929972,52.0556359],[-1.7931211,52.055589],[-1.7935129,52.0554406],[-1.7941083,52.0552613],[-1.7941506,52.0552486],[-1.7948204,52.0558581],[-1.7953155,52.0563506],[-1.7958019,52.0568642],[-1.7958886,52.0570174],[-1.7959785,52.0571718],[-1.7961156,52.057512],[-1.796267,52.0575599],[-1.7970188,52.0571663],[-1.7972258,52.0570026],[-1.7983009,52.0562375],[-1.7987058,52.0560397],[-1.799251,52.0558164],[-1.7999512,52.0555706],[-1.8004031,52.0554043],[-1.8014457,52.0549913],[-1.8017599,52.0547971],[-1.8018522,52.0546316],[-1.8020306,52.0541353],[-1.8021525,52.0539571],[-1.8022123,52.053861],[-1.8022635,52.0537405],[-1.8022883,52.0536893],[-1.8021543,52.0535655],[-1.8019647,52.0532795],[-1.8017257,52.0530283],[-1.8009701,52.0520362],[-1.8009678,52.0520086],[-1.8008344,52.0518459],[-1.8009033,52.0517837],[-1.800845,52.0516506],[-1.802327,52.0504686],[-1.8029958,52.0499127],[-1.8036343,52.0493314],[-1.8038664,52.0490881],[-1.8041162,52.0488705],[-1.8048197,52.0483407],[-1.8053427,52.0480468],[-1.8053901,52.0480224],[-1.805312,52.0479271],[-1.8052014,52.0478156],[-1.8052386,52.0477939],[-1.8055581,52.0476229],[-1.805899,52.0473368],[-1.8062057,52.0470461],[-1.8065734,52.0467029],[-1.8082136,52.0455277],[-1.8086089,52.0452661],[-1.8091567,52.0449516],[-1.8094528,52.0447814],[-1.8097,52.0446784],[-1.8102747,52.0444377],[-1.8114926,52.0438683],[-1.8121894,52.0435341],[-1.8128037,52.0430731],[-1.8133725,52.0426879],[-1.8139014,52.042427],[-1.8142874,52.0422742],[-1.8150373,52.0418502],[-1.8158446,52.0414714],[-1.8165456,52.0409889],[-1.8172354,52.0404429],[-1.8177759,52.0400093],[-1.8180118,52.0397346],[-1.818232,52.0394408],[-1.8188376,52.0389364],[-1.8194472,52.0383786],[-1.8197729,52.0381952],[-1.8200341,52.0379671],[-1.8204316,52.0375691],[-1.8205051,52.037481],[-1.8205424,52.0373522],[-1.8205673,52.0372309],[-1.8206236,52.0371837],[-1.8216116,52.0358495],[-1.8248588,52.0333378],[-1.8251817,52.0330776],[-1.8252553,52.033052],[-1.8284804,52.0319312],[-1.8284971,52.0318984],[-1.8284976,52.0318646],[-1.8284924,52.0318274],[-1.8284241,52.0317727],[-1.8278781,52.0315945],[-1.827297,52.0313337],[-1.8268492,52.0309756],[-1.82641,52.0304814],[-1.8263141,52.0301757],[-1.8264518,52.0300233],[-1.8265689,52.0299429],[-1.8267096,52.0298927],[-1.8268357,52.0298487],[-1.8269779,52.029973],[-1.8271991,52.0301552],[-1.8273488,52.0301972],[-1.8276879,52.0304593],[-1.8277882,52.0305421],[-1.828188,52.0308318],[-1.8283779,52.0309332],[-1.8285173,52.0310191],[-1.8289786,52.0312198],[-1.8292453,52.0313377],[-1.8296052,52.0314713],[-1.8297298,52.0314875],[-1.8299201,52.0315019],[-1.8301069,52.0314834],[-1.8303283,52.0314182],[-1.8309125,52.0311636],[-1.8311755,52.0310744],[-1.8315008,52.0306376],[-1.8317292,52.0304518],[-1.8318021,52.0301374],[-1.8319387,52.0299334],[-1.8322318,52.0294877],[-1.8326775,52.0292025],[-1.8331009,52.0287613],[-1.8333148,52.0284404],[-1.8333505,52.0279055],[-1.8337024,52.0274243],[-1.8337507,52.0273082],[-1.8337915,52.0267389],[-1.8338128,52.0267118],[-1.8338288,52.0266912],[-1.8338741,52.0264909],[-1.833921,52.0262832],[-1.8342463,52.0257974],[-1.8348034,52.0252893],[-1.8351672,52.0249744],[-1.8352175,52.0248454],[-1.8352362,52.0247364],[-1.8352641,52.0246266],[-1.8353179,52.0244914],[-1.8353899,52.0243107],[-1.83543,52.0243001],[-1.8367398,52.0248948],[-1.8369862,52.0250009],[-1.8380292,52.025462],[-1.8383749,52.0256718],[-1.8390902,52.0259591],[-1.8397035,52.0262425],[-1.8399858,52.0263808],[-1.8400207,52.026394],[-1.8400576,52.0264178],[-1.840869,52.026803],[-1.8418328,52.0272464],[-1.8422976,52.0274639],[-1.8423466,52.0274868],[-1.8424088,52.0275144],[-1.8431079,52.0278245],[-1.8438579,52.0281938],[-1.8441478,52.028477],[-1.844483,52.0288306],[-1.8444992,52.0288477],[-1.8445288,52.0288668],[-1.8445718,52.0289043],[-1.8446578,52.028971],[-1.8447925,52.0290985],[-1.8450209,52.0293339],[-1.8451716,52.0294981],[-1.845551,52.0298829],[-1.8458951,52.0302298],[-1.8462507,52.0305424],[-1.846489,52.0306568],[-1.8466757,52.0307335],[-1.8472865,52.0309906],[-1.847849,52.0312638],[-1.8483954,52.0316013],[-1.8487811,52.031746],[-1.8492954,52.031987],[-1.8494835,52.0320408],[-1.8495469,52.0320589],[-1.8499125,52.0321097],[-1.8502546,52.0321676],[-1.8506056,52.0322367],[-1.8511276,52.0325495],[-1.8515261,52.0329693],[-1.8518313,52.0332797],[-1.8521562,52.0335355],[-1.8521985,52.0336206],[-1.8523008,52.033771],[-1.8525258,52.0342853],[-1.8526383,52.034671],[-1.8527257,52.0348548],[-1.8527543,52.0349194],[-1.852827,52.0351338],[-1.8529273,52.0354906],[-1.8529573,52.0357913],[-1.8529314,52.035895],[-1.8528838,52.0360005],[-1.8528502,52.036145],[-1.8529254,52.0363862],[-1.8529455,52.0365776],[-1.8529904,52.0367052],[-1.853286,52.0366796],[-1.8534344,52.036659],[-1.85359,52.0366374],[-1.8539206,52.0365892],[-1.8539912,52.0365789],[-1.8544366,52.0365073],[-1.8551309,52.036374],[-1.8554727,52.0363083],[-1.855877,52.0362305],[-1.8560154,52.036218],[-1.8561904,52.0361962],[-1.856336,52.0361868],[-1.8566177,52.0361772],[-1.8571474,52.0361679],[-1.8577355,52.0361493],[-1.8579142,52.0361409],[-1.858,52.0361369],[-1.8583428,52.0361218],[-1.8583999,52.0361193],[-1.8592047,52.0360975],[-1.8593414,52.0359796],[-1.8596422,52.0359698],[-1.8599726,52.0359632],[-1.8602387,52.0359551],[-1.8603952,52.0359537],[-1.8604893,52.03596],[-1.8610376,52.0359429],[-1.8615278,52.0359198],[-1.8616291,52.0358893],[-1.8617579,52.0358629],[-1.8618521,52.0358511],[-1.861979,52.0358374],[-1.8621059,52.035829],[-1.8621295,52.0358797],[-1.8622499,52.0358362],[-1.8623389,52.0358173],[-1.8624353,52.0358145],[-1.8624948,52.0358448],[-1.8625617,52.0358622],[-1.8628144,52.035826],[-1.8629005,52.035813],[-1.8629327,52.0358231],[-1.8632771,52.0357784],[-1.863689,52.0357203],[-1.863986,52.0356806],[-1.8640046,52.0356133],[-1.8640108,52.0355625],[-1.8640134,52.0355412],[-1.864022,52.0354705],[-1.8640169,52.0353253],[-1.8640013,52.0352625],[-1.8639819,52.0351846],[-1.8638843,52.0349622],[-1.8637499,52.0347236],[-1.8636019,52.0343389],[-1.8634966,52.0339655],[-1.8634891,52.0339267],[-1.8642387,52.0337413],[-1.8643498,52.03371],[-1.8644436,52.0336804],[-1.8661404,52.0333319],[-1.8662762,52.0333005],[-1.8663664,52.033265],[-1.866631,52.0331609],[-1.867221,52.0329739],[-1.8695982,52.0319892],[-1.8697884,52.0319224],[-1.8699313,52.0319004],[-1.8700082,52.0318897],[-1.8700367,52.0318681],[-1.8703196,52.0316163],[-1.8704636,52.0316539],[-1.870659,52.031439],[-1.8711049,52.0311004],[-1.8716289,52.030863],[-1.872229,52.030649],[-1.8731146,52.0303282],[-1.8732136,52.0302566],[-1.873101,52.029791],[-1.872946,52.029324],[-1.872871,52.029053],[-1.8728293,52.0289851],[-1.8728006,52.0288386],[-1.8729184,52.0286835],[-1.873204,52.028449],[-1.8732336,52.0282691],[-1.8733256,52.028195],[-1.8734691,52.0281739],[-1.8735954,52.0281093],[-1.8736655,52.0280565],[-1.8735859,52.0280008],[-1.873568,52.0278946],[-1.8733222,52.0265477],[-1.8734371,52.0258991],[-1.873563,52.0254079],[-1.8735637,52.0248961],[-1.8735621,52.0246946],[-1.8735521,52.0246726],[-1.8735096,52.0245789],[-1.8733615,52.0243765],[-1.8731116,52.024082],[-1.8731214,52.0240419],[-1.8731358,52.024014],[-1.873212,52.0240159],[-1.8734742,52.0239705],[-1.8735014,52.0239657],[-1.8734795,52.023919],[-1.8734066,52.0231024],[-1.8732789,52.022113],[-1.8731851,52.0217907],[-1.8729394,52.0209259],[-1.872873,52.0206909],[-1.8727384,52.0203069],[-1.872399,52.0193389],[-1.8722378,52.0190081],[-1.8720071,52.0184986],[-1.8718569,52.0180707],[-1.8718034,52.0177705],[-1.871799,52.0177511],[-1.8717904,52.0177273],[-1.8717612,52.0176262],[-1.8717679,52.0175418],[-1.8722508,52.0175539],[-1.8723899,52.0175609],[-1.8725922,52.0175268],[-1.8728372,52.0174014],[-1.8730266,52.0172562],[-1.8731959,52.0171062],[-1.8734037,52.0168811],[-1.8734882,52.0168213],[-1.8736025,52.0167949],[-1.8736255,52.016785],[-1.8736513,52.016774],[-1.8738046,52.01672],[-1.8740198,52.0166829],[-1.8743236,52.0166544],[-1.8745445,52.0166733],[-1.8747442,52.0167048],[-1.8748109,52.0167186],[-1.8749229,52.0167418],[-1.875551,52.0168372],[-1.8761692,52.0168478],[-1.8764777,52.0167967],[-1.8768137,52.0167144],[-1.8774991,52.0165013],[-1.877975,52.016324],[-1.878449,52.0161339],[-1.8788165,52.0159353],[-1.8792027,52.015705],[-1.8796291,52.0155623],[-1.8800259,52.0153728],[-1.8801347,52.01529],[-1.8802272,52.0152195],[-1.8803666,52.0151134],[-1.8805358,52.0149283],[-1.8806179,52.0148109],[-1.8809653,52.0143257],[-1.881188,52.013828],[-1.8813998,52.0129403],[-1.8814116,52.0128868],[-1.8814339,52.0128143],[-1.8813876,52.0126514],[-1.8813557,52.0123902],[-1.881328,52.012081],[-1.880863,52.010119],[-1.88081,52.0099142],[-1.8808194,52.0097815],[-1.8807816,52.0094696],[-1.8807755,52.0093283],[-1.880853,52.0090213],[-1.8808546,52.0088776],[-1.8807676,52.0085253],[-1.8806984,52.008295],[-1.8805764,52.0077893],[-1.8804718,52.0071443],[-1.8804286,52.0069233],[-1.8804183,52.006832],[-1.8804299,52.0067427],[-1.8805466,52.0063627],[-1.880658,52.006081],[-1.8806862,52.0059344],[-1.8806937,52.0058431],[-1.880675,52.0057404],[-1.8805896,52.0056026],[-1.8804416,52.0055026],[-1.8805489,52.0055059],[-1.8806716,52.0055191],[-1.8808149,52.0055168],[-1.881644,52.0053479],[-1.8819239,52.005123],[-1.882344,52.004013],[-1.882661,52.0026729],[-1.8828459,52.0016389],[-1.883224,52.000843],[-1.8839118,51.9999645],[-1.8839929,51.999861],[-1.884553,51.999314],[-1.8847356,51.9990968],[-1.8848599,51.9989489],[-1.884921,51.9988039],[-1.8850094,51.9987245],[-1.8850227,51.9987125],[-1.8851378,51.9985604],[-1.88548,51.9984629],[-1.8858059,51.998436],[-1.886634,51.998423],[-1.887349,51.9985289],[-1.8880639,51.998908],[-1.888753,51.999418],[-1.889123,51.9996529],[-1.889396,51.999761],[-1.889798,52.000053],[-1.8899779,52.000251],[-1.8902666,52.0004535],[-1.890434,52.0005709],[-1.890808,52.000666],[-1.890975,52.0007579],[-1.891234,52.001456],[-1.891089,52.0017839],[-1.891278,52.002023],[-1.8913859,52.002278],[-1.891709,52.002569],[-1.8917739,52.002806],[-1.891424,52.0032459],[-1.8912791,52.0034567],[-1.8916179,52.0035629],[-1.8918609,52.003788],[-1.8922989,52.0037698],[-1.8929341,52.0039472],[-1.8935734,52.0041582],[-1.8952679,52.0048128],[-1.8956646,52.0048784],[-1.895774,52.0048974],[-1.896369,52.005239],[-1.8967382,52.0055405],[-1.8974859,52.0057689],[-1.8975264,52.0057839],[-1.897821,52.0058929],[-1.897983,52.0058639],[-1.8981572,52.0057854],[-1.8982369,52.0057849],[-1.8984177,52.0058461],[-1.8985769,52.0060106],[-1.8987556,52.0062032],[-1.8988551,52.0062727],[-1.8993438,52.0063592],[-1.8996746,52.0063953],[-1.9001996,52.0064917],[-1.9004195,52.0065323],[-1.9012382,52.0066342],[-1.9016973,52.0066803],[-1.9019342,52.0066914],[-1.9021353,52.0066683],[-1.902369,52.0066309],[-1.9023828,52.0065689],[-1.9024772,52.0064909],[-1.9025457,52.0063778],[-1.902697,52.0059407],[-1.9028096,52.005635],[-1.9028427,52.0055476],[-1.902891,52.00542],[-1.9030027,52.0052554],[-1.9030907,52.005196],[-1.903204,52.0051892],[-1.9032123,52.0050956],[-1.9032164,52.0049656],[-1.9032107,52.004957],[-1.9031566,52.0048759],[-1.903027,52.0047785],[-1.9030486,52.0047612],[-1.9033638,52.0045119],[-1.9036106,52.0041685],[-1.9038198,52.0037557],[-1.9038841,52.0034783],[-1.9038198,52.0033297],[-1.9037903,52.003167],[-1.9037795,52.0030679],[-1.9038064,52.0030168],[-1.9038292,52.002987],[-1.9039217,52.0028442],[-1.9042194,52.0023604],[-1.9044957,52.0018865],[-1.9047398,52.0014638],[-1.9050455,52.0010014],[-1.9053352,52.000582],[-1.905413,52.000402],[-1.9054479,52.0003392],[-1.9055954,52.0002798],[-1.906046,52.0000701],[-1.9065771,51.999715],[-1.9067541,51.9994277],[-1.9069414,51.9992216],[-1.9074676,51.9986433],[-1.9076687,51.9984121],[-1.9077036,51.9983659],[-1.9078753,51.9980455],[-1.9080577,51.9974543],[-1.9082132,51.9968498],[-1.908224,51.9963247],[-1.908224,51.9959349],[-1.9088378,51.9952359],[-1.9092968,51.9946369],[-1.9097743,51.9941942],[-1.9104341,51.993603],[-1.9115218,51.9927769],[-1.9128079,51.9919819],[-1.9131029,51.9917763],[-1.9132552,51.9917097],[-1.9132589,51.9915401],[-1.9133287,51.9913882],[-1.9134408,51.9912509],[-1.9135891,51.9910376],[-1.9137905,51.9907285],[-1.9138061,51.9906941],[-1.913921,51.9904418],[-1.913963,51.9902733],[-1.9140015,51.9901316],[-1.914004,51.9899202],[-1.9139789,51.9897792],[-1.9139164,51.9896222],[-1.9138618,51.9895256],[-1.9137995,51.9894793],[-1.9137322,51.9894597],[-1.9136698,51.9894532],[-1.9135794,51.9894604],[-1.9131323,51.9895307],[-1.9128407,51.989562],[-1.9127068,51.9895802],[-1.9125958,51.9895779],[-1.9125549,51.9895754],[-1.9124982,51.9895645],[-1.9124255,51.9895388],[-1.912343,51.9894908],[-1.9122807,51.9894312],[-1.9122632,51.9894019],[-1.9122266,51.9893408],[-1.9121778,51.9892294],[-1.9121692,51.9890973],[-1.911963,51.9890592],[-1.9117258,51.9890028],[-1.9115528,51.9889497],[-1.9115332,51.9889343],[-1.9114238,51.988947],[-1.911279,51.9889106],[-1.9111207,51.988838],[-1.9108981,51.9886777],[-1.9106755,51.9885208],[-1.9105602,51.988425],[-1.9105655,51.9883672],[-1.9106763,51.9883257],[-1.9107181,51.988169],[-1.9106911,51.988039],[-1.9105789,51.9878915],[-1.9104556,51.9877676],[-1.9100237,51.9874075],[-1.9099835,51.9873211],[-1.9093933,51.9872466],[-1.909389,51.9865477],[-1.909394,51.986342],[-1.9093521,51.9851399],[-1.9093584,51.9850412],[-1.9093348,51.9844692],[-1.9093594,51.9841014],[-1.909366,51.98308],[-1.909366,51.9830606],[-1.9093661,51.9830287],[-1.9093688,51.9828385],[-1.9096356,51.9802282],[-1.9096619,51.979858],[-1.9096606,51.9798009],[-1.9093802,51.9797782],[-1.9091257,51.9797359],[-1.9089001,51.9796818],[-1.9080904,51.9797458],[-1.9075377,51.9798045],[-1.9072806,51.9798318],[-1.9063799,51.9794017],[-1.905426,51.978749],[-1.905089,51.978393],[-1.9050536,51.9782312],[-1.9048459,51.977841],[-1.9044329,51.977359],[-1.903319,51.976624],[-1.90231,51.9759079],[-1.901533,51.9756929],[-1.900113,51.975511],[-1.899376,51.975488],[-1.899208,51.975071],[-1.899104,51.9746029],[-1.8986913,51.9742244],[-1.898439,51.9739611],[-1.8982611,51.9739423],[-1.8975224,51.9739033],[-1.8972725,51.9739254],[-1.8967477,51.9738414],[-1.8961495,51.9737297],[-1.8957427,51.9737116],[-1.8952843,51.9735215],[-1.8950427,51.9734927],[-1.8946034,51.9735606],[-1.894184,51.973543],[-1.8935309,51.973331],[-1.892678,51.972856],[-1.8911713,51.9720744],[-1.891057,51.9719454],[-1.8912047,51.971855],[-1.891898,51.9715829],[-1.89403,51.970641],[-1.895926,51.9698389],[-1.8972878,51.9692828],[-1.897496,51.9691515],[-1.8982211,51.9686927],[-1.899566,51.9679019],[-1.9005679,51.9672393],[-1.900659,51.967204],[-1.901506,51.9676062],[-1.9016077,51.967588],[-1.9016384,51.9675655],[-1.902034,51.967693],[-1.9031984,51.9681397],[-1.903464,51.968513],[-1.903835,51.968911],[-1.9041559,51.969129],[-1.9048759,51.9688489],[-1.905886,51.968521],[-1.9062763,51.9684016],[-1.9071509,51.9682309],[-1.9075281,51.9681647],[-1.908241,51.9680681],[-1.908953,51.968048],[-1.9092209,51.9680515],[-1.9094289,51.9680615],[-1.9095412,51.9680767],[-1.9097111,51.9680573],[-1.9098299,51.9680173],[-1.9100112,51.9679375],[-1.9102089,51.9677757],[-1.9104449,51.9674645],[-1.9122482,51.9660541],[-1.912449,51.965793],[-1.912966,51.965443],[-1.9134279,51.9650728],[-1.9152676,51.9630268],[-1.9152888,51.9630033],[-1.915621,51.9632708],[-1.9158166,51.9634335],[-1.916083,51.963576],[-1.916819,51.963936],[-1.917924,51.964528],[-1.918489,51.965031],[-1.9187999,51.965604],[-1.9191289,51.966484],[-1.919479,51.9669809],[-1.9197566,51.9671142],[-1.9198479,51.967158],[-1.920518,51.9673229],[-1.9210859,51.9676559],[-1.921319,51.9678439],[-1.9215248,51.9678601],[-1.9223095,51.9678601],[-1.9226733,51.9679103],[-1.9230123,51.9680121],[-1.923115,51.9681226],[-1.923281,51.9683729],[-1.923577,51.9685548],[-1.9236542,51.9686069],[-1.9237853,51.9686506],[-1.9238894,51.968674],[-1.9241833,51.9687027],[-1.9248472,51.9687457],[-1.9252698,51.9687721],[-1.9258551,51.9688254],[-1.9261281,51.9688546],[-1.9263978,51.9688989],[-1.9266624,51.9689698],[-1.9268951,51.9690483],[-1.927191,51.9691659],[-1.9275954,51.9693226],[-1.927999,51.9694789],[-1.9280388,51.9694574],[-1.9282759,51.969329],[-1.928918,51.969144],[-1.929811,51.968943],[-1.9311072,51.9687694],[-1.931357,51.9687185],[-1.9316312,51.9686259],[-1.9321741,51.9684084],[-1.932222,51.9684991],[-1.93233,51.9687034],[-1.9324427,51.9690228],[-1.9325948,51.9694741],[-1.9328713,51.9693348],[-1.933158,51.969176],[-1.933589,51.968958],[-1.9338037,51.9688266],[-1.9340709,51.9686629],[-1.93465,51.968108],[-1.935258,51.967508],[-1.9359179,51.9667449],[-1.9359447,51.9666845],[-1.9360734,51.9666866],[-1.9364172,51.966714],[-1.9365605,51.9667286],[-1.9370858,51.9668267],[-1.9375046,51.9668868],[-1.937729,51.966786],[-1.939921,51.9657979],[-1.9401704,51.9656451],[-1.9404839,51.9654529],[-1.941496,51.965193],[-1.9424129,51.9648489],[-1.943226,51.9644459],[-1.9437363,51.9641682],[-1.943961,51.9640459],[-1.944288,51.9637599],[-1.9448226,51.9634552],[-1.946693,51.9623889],[-1.946851,51.962238],[-1.948211,51.961719],[-1.9497889,51.961359],[-1.95049,51.960844],[-1.9505529,51.960668],[-1.950688,51.9604479],[-1.9513399,51.960503],[-1.954036,51.959476],[-1.9543189,51.959304],[-1.954891,51.959261],[-1.9551509,51.9592739],[-1.9576979,51.958511],[-1.9583233,51.9585316],[-1.9595212,51.9585659],[-1.9595755,51.9585728],[-1.9597652,51.9582227],[-1.95987,51.9580989],[-1.9599475,51.9580177],[-1.96005,51.957936],[-1.9602047,51.957848],[-1.9603504,51.9577838],[-1.9604869,51.9577327],[-1.9605671,51.9577061],[-1.9607479,51.9576467],[-1.9609505,51.9575782],[-1.9611083,51.9574974],[-1.9613326,51.9573506],[-1.9614139,51.957264],[-1.9615005,51.9571616],[-1.9615693,51.9570706],[-1.9616915,51.956852],[-1.9617463,51.9567116],[-1.9618339,51.9563864],[-1.9618715,51.9562726],[-1.9619757,51.956058],[-1.9619993,51.9560095],[-1.9621926,51.9556897],[-1.9622615,51.9555817],[-1.9623493,51.9554372],[-1.9623834,51.955381],[-1.9624535,51.9552656],[-1.962537,51.9551341],[-1.9626306,51.9549817],[-1.9627471,51.9548107],[-1.9628523,51.9546679],[-1.9633885,51.9540599],[-1.9635855,51.9538578],[-1.9638732,51.9535853],[-1.9640394,51.9534778],[-1.9642276,51.9533877],[-1.9647124,51.9531942],[-1.9650777,51.9530863],[-1.9652156,51.9530326],[-1.9653251,51.9529954],[-1.9654803,51.9529246],[-1.965837,51.9527758],[-1.9660941,51.9526941],[-1.9663185,51.9526211],[-1.9667048,51.952502],[-1.9666892,51.9524619],[-1.966643,51.9523433],[-1.9664965,51.9519013],[-1.9663658,51.9515985],[-1.96632,51.9514902],[-1.9662623,51.9513837],[-1.966364,51.9513312],[-1.9669133,51.9509931],[-1.9672675,51.9507458],[-1.967502,51.9505949],[-1.9676516,51.9504393],[-1.9679023,51.9501555],[-1.968112,51.9498152],[-1.9690586,51.9493066],[-1.969966,51.9488266],[-1.9702757,51.9486676],[-1.9706862,51.9484828],[-1.9714369,51.9481182],[-1.9717587,51.9479768],[-1.9720482,51.9478301],[-1.9724187,51.947595],[-1.9728549,51.9473244],[-1.973076,51.9472071],[-1.9731875,51.9471675],[-1.973168,51.9471524],[-1.9730628,51.9470676],[-1.9729812,51.9468462],[-1.9728813,51.9465545],[-1.9727676,51.9461971],[-1.9727562,51.9461435],[-1.9726818,51.9457948],[-1.9726421,51.9454099],[-1.9726564,51.9451769],[-1.9727322,51.9449624],[-1.972797,51.944738],[-1.9728392,51.9445963],[-1.9730317,51.9445153],[-1.9731032,51.9444664],[-1.9731722,51.9444144],[-1.9732353,51.9443674],[-1.9732985,51.944304],[-1.9733154,51.9442055],[-1.9733045,51.9441389],[-1.9732824,51.9440397],[-1.9732576,51.9439625],[-1.9732521,51.943844],[-1.9732687,51.9437172],[-1.9733183,51.9435602],[-1.9733734,51.943359],[-1.9734044,51.9432263],[-1.973423,51.9431468],[-1.9735415,51.9427637],[-1.9736658,51.9422954],[-1.9737149,51.9421366],[-1.9737537,51.9420087],[-1.9738198,51.9418075],[-1.9738694,51.9416256],[-1.9739686,51.9413115],[-1.9739686,51.9412646],[-1.9740182,51.941113],[-1.9740521,51.9409989],[-1.9741144,51.9408244],[-1.9741441,51.9407138],[-1.9741976,51.9405483],[-1.9743213,51.9403687],[-1.974322,51.9403679],[-1.9743722,51.94005],[-1.9743314,51.9397414],[-1.9743515,51.9395535],[-1.9744094,51.9393792],[-1.9742556,51.9388517],[-1.9739905,51.9384021],[-1.9738474,51.9375184],[-1.9736918,51.9372632],[-1.9735425,51.9366658],[-1.9733993,51.9364729],[-1.9732991,51.9362235],[-1.9733111,51.9354792],[-1.9732511,51.9353651],[-1.9732391,51.9352571],[-1.9732361,51.935158],[-1.9731237,51.9350842],[-1.9731287,51.9350519],[-1.9732299,51.9349971],[-1.9730422,51.9349218],[-1.9728692,51.9348512],[-1.9724521,51.9346652],[-1.9722205,51.9345443],[-1.9725352,51.9344017],[-1.972663,51.934257],[-1.9727611,51.9340943],[-1.9728481,51.9338484],[-1.9728094,51.9337931],[-1.9726348,51.9337539],[-1.9712328,51.9336216],[-1.9710148,51.9335828],[-1.9708685,51.9335235],[-1.9707798,51.9334221],[-1.9708001,51.9333279],[-1.9714176,51.9330029],[-1.9717028,51.9328497],[-1.9721601,51.9325559],[-1.9725147,51.9322852],[-1.9728417,51.9319637],[-1.9732819,51.9314841],[-1.9734079,51.9312905],[-1.9734858,51.93111],[-1.9734955,51.9310336],[-1.9734762,51.930951],[-1.973474,51.9308302],[-1.9734311,51.9307626],[-1.9733274,51.9306929],[-1.9727141,51.9303738],[-1.9724276,51.9302411],[-1.9721918,51.9301225],[-1.9719882,51.9299895],[-1.9716989,51.9295636],[-1.9715641,51.9291848],[-1.9715382,51.9290171],[-1.9714658,51.9288645],[-1.9714337,51.9287439],[-1.9713419,51.9285511],[-1.9712415,51.9284049],[-1.9711765,51.928318],[-1.9710834,51.9281262],[-1.9709758,51.9279555],[-1.9708361,51.9278459],[-1.9707742,51.9277261],[-1.9707757,51.927706],[-1.9708349,51.9276947],[-1.9709197,51.9276627],[-1.9710168,51.9276641],[-1.9711102,51.9276399],[-1.9712083,51.9276266],[-1.9712833,51.9275946],[-1.9715896,51.9275366],[-1.9719893,51.9274844],[-1.9725315,51.9273976],[-1.9730797,51.9273254],[-1.9744128,51.9271533],[-1.9757417,51.9269748],[-1.9770916,51.9267689],[-1.9787228,51.9265127],[-1.9804209,51.9262488],[-1.9806382,51.9262319],[-1.9810085,51.9258502],[-1.9813832,51.9255437],[-1.9817367,51.925212],[-1.9819966,51.9249819],[-1.9821643,51.9248253],[-1.9823063,51.9247126],[-1.9824558,51.9246222],[-1.9826084,51.9245477],[-1.982752,51.9244881],[-1.9831856,51.9243735],[-1.9837534,51.9242039],[-1.9838675,51.9241647],[-1.9839772,51.9241154],[-1.9843987,51.9238713],[-1.9847636,51.9236457],[-1.9850672,51.9234793],[-1.985109,51.9234954],[-1.9868978,51.9243171],[-1.9882897,51.9248646],[-1.9899787,51.9254919],[-1.9911248,51.925938],[-1.9918639,51.9262701],[-1.991887,51.9263878],[-1.9918549,51.92651],[-1.9916933,51.9267963],[-1.9914358,51.9273454],[-1.9910904,51.9282026],[-1.9909959,51.9283825],[-1.9909702,51.9286419],[-1.990953,51.9289224],[-1.9909445,51.9293775],[-1.9909359,51.9297004],[-1.9909187,51.9299121],[-1.9909702,51.9300973],[-1.9910303,51.9304413],[-1.9911161,51.93087],[-1.9911762,51.9311294],[-1.9912019,51.9314257],[-1.9911934,51.931775],[-1.9911934,51.9320396],[-1.9911333,51.9321825],[-1.9909445,51.9323783],[-1.9906955,51.9326588],[-1.9904209,51.9330028],[-1.9901806,51.9332939],[-1.9899746,51.9335903],[-1.9898382,51.9337596],[-1.9898033,51.9338827],[-1.9893607,51.9342271],[-1.9891381,51.9343761],[-1.9889638,51.934459],[-1.988768,51.9345452],[-1.9885889,51.9345787],[-1.9886795,51.9346143],[-1.990003,51.934756],[-1.9902559,51.9348079],[-1.990614,51.9352109],[-1.990853,51.935346],[-1.991541,51.935623],[-1.9919139,51.935833],[-1.9923513,51.9368303],[-1.9923332,51.9369442],[-1.9922944,51.9370116],[-1.9923175,51.9370328],[-1.992414,51.9370587],[-1.9924634,51.9370473],[-1.9925149,51.9370263],[-1.9926298,51.9370595],[-1.994679,51.938026],[-1.9947193,51.9380243],[-1.9948403,51.9380192],[-1.9949023,51.9380563],[-1.995471,51.9382029],[-1.9958317,51.938274],[-1.995933,51.938294],[-1.9967152,51.9384571],[-1.9969702,51.9385103],[-1.9975647,51.938638],[-1.9979768,51.9387367],[-1.9981288,51.9387803],[-1.9982597,51.9388131],[-1.9987227,51.9389383],[-1.9994002,51.939154],[-2.0000387,51.9393693],[-2.0003338,51.9394929],[-2.0003902,51.9395224],[-2.0009958,51.9398385],[-2.0011409,51.9399012],[-2.0011808,51.9398482],[-2.0015284,51.9396336],[-2.00178,51.9394527],[-2.0019428,51.9393906],[-2.0027672,51.9391635],[-2.0028612,51.9391155],[-2.0032247,51.9387939],[-2.0033094,51.9387501],[-2.0033933,51.9387375],[-2.0035846,51.9387515],[-2.0038923,51.9387805],[-2.0039583,51.9387727],[-2.004493,51.9388248],[-2.0046086,51.9388564],[-2.0047145,51.9389043],[-2.0046977,51.9389822],[-2.0043583,51.9396289],[-2.0041901,51.9400528],[-2.0041268,51.9404696],[-2.004028,51.9410504],[-2.0040353,51.9411524],[-2.0039306,51.9420039],[-2.0038448,51.9420727],[-2.0037418,51.9422843],[-2.0035444,51.942533],[-2.0033727,51.9427499],[-2.0032268,51.9429034],[-2.0031753,51.9429827],[-2.0031753,51.9430515],[-2.0031925,51.9431044],[-2.0032354,51.9431574],[-2.0033244,51.9431733],[-2.0035738,51.9432963],[-2.0039018,51.9434387],[-2.0044177,51.9436083],[-2.004746,51.9437341],[-2.005055,51.9438081],[-2.0052334,51.9438518],[-2.00539,51.9438791],[-2.0058109,51.9438916],[-2.006655,51.9439167],[-2.0085469,51.9438648],[-2.0108573,51.9438694],[-2.0129763,51.9438364],[-2.0143372,51.9437238],[-2.0155425,51.9434185],[-2.0163481,51.9433086],[-2.0167273,51.9432428],[-2.0169667,51.9431708],[-2.0170616,51.9431525],[-2.0173409,51.9430568],[-2.0174232,51.9430389],[-2.0174901,51.9429793],[-2.0175521,51.9428674],[-2.0176419,51.9427957],[-2.0177771,51.9426427],[-2.0178582,51.9423832],[-2.0179202,51.9421488],[-2.0180185,51.9419868],[-2.018136,51.9418168],[-2.0182749,51.9415587],[-2.0184856,51.9411082],[-2.0186189,51.9408053],[-2.0188432,51.9403851],[-2.0190671,51.940032],[-2.0192732,51.9397984],[-2.0197633,51.9395693],[-2.0205026,51.9393644],[-2.0209542,51.9392115],[-2.021033,51.939135],[-2.0211415,51.9390631],[-2.0214468,51.9389305],[-2.0220214,51.9387537],[-2.0224312,51.9386894],[-2.0226538,51.9385651],[-2.0228034,51.9383415],[-2.0227605,51.9381031],[-2.022825,51.9377854],[-2.0230459,51.937474],[-2.0231194,51.937261],[-2.0231993,51.9370894],[-2.0232551,51.9368704],[-2.0227808,51.9364635],[-2.0224232,51.9361702],[-2.0221595,51.9360525],[-2.0220618,51.9359839],[-2.0222826,51.9357765],[-2.0226442,51.9354108],[-2.0228189,51.9351336],[-2.0229797,51.9346836],[-2.0233332,51.9342175],[-2.0237155,51.9338769],[-2.0239439,51.9336711],[-2.0244422,51.9331247],[-2.024635,51.9327229],[-2.0244904,51.9323854],[-2.0247531,51.9316357],[-2.0245804,51.9314366],[-2.0247462,51.9307493],[-2.0247223,51.9304364],[-2.0245225,51.9294963],[-2.0242006,51.9290292],[-2.0238455,51.9287427],[-2.0240026,51.9284245],[-2.0240423,51.9283441],[-2.0243127,51.9278926],[-2.0243208,51.9275343],[-2.0239168,51.9272555],[-2.0232817,51.9271314],[-2.0226921,51.9269263],[-2.0222616,51.9266616],[-2.021663,51.9262935],[-2.0200718,51.9256415],[-2.0200453,51.9255743],[-2.0200168,51.9255158],[-2.0199543,51.9254329],[-2.0198994,51.9252825],[-2.0197864,51.9252302],[-2.0196306,51.9251302],[-2.0189676,51.9246049],[-2.0189351,51.9245791],[-2.0187908,51.9244363],[-2.018632,51.9241967],[-2.0184574,51.9239482],[-2.0183261,51.9238181],[-2.018349,51.9236789],[-2.018483,51.9234329],[-2.0185877,51.9232796],[-2.0184913,51.9230575],[-2.018309,51.922922],[-2.0181192,51.9227053],[-2.0177692,51.9224414],[-2.017243,51.9222689],[-2.016828,51.921971],[-2.0164479,51.921431],[-2.016326,51.9210309],[-2.0162663,51.9205979],[-2.0162609,51.920559],[-2.015719,51.9204979],[-2.015449,51.9204409],[-2.0152079,51.920288],[-2.015118,51.920114],[-2.0149079,51.919798],[-2.0147909,51.919341],[-2.0147451,51.9190201],[-2.0147189,51.918836],[-2.0147929,51.9182549],[-2.0147939,51.9175529],[-2.014913,51.917341],[-2.014961,51.9169609],[-2.014918,51.916813],[-2.0147059,51.916651],[-2.014451,51.916591],[-2.0144036,51.9165659],[-2.014213,51.916465],[-2.0140579,51.916189],[-2.013939,51.915613],[-2.013918,51.915218],[-2.013976,51.914968],[-2.0139729,51.91481],[-2.0140159,51.9143889],[-2.013951,51.9139259],[-2.013924,51.913298],[-2.0139729,51.9127309],[-2.0139459,51.911764],[-2.0131222,51.9097131],[-2.014051,51.9105479],[-2.0141059,51.9101179],[-2.0140159,51.909933],[-2.0141009,51.9096429],[-2.014053,51.9094829],[-2.0138159,51.909126],[-2.0135709,51.9088949],[-2.013314,51.908718],[-2.013231,51.908513],[-2.013221,51.9082339],[-2.013379,51.908099],[-2.013633,51.907833],[-2.013751,51.9075129],[-2.0136559,51.907416],[-2.0136845,51.9072664],[-2.013401,51.9072972],[-2.0128261,51.9073621],[-2.0128197,51.907277],[-2.013363,51.906998],[-2.0135562,51.906867],[-2.0139332,51.9065143],[-2.0144493,51.9060132],[-2.0156315,51.9055231],[-2.0164252,51.9050291],[-2.017908,51.9041006],[-2.0179418,51.9039958],[-2.017588,51.903546],[-2.0170614,51.9028859],[-2.0169406,51.9027584],[-2.0167607,51.9025685],[-2.0159567,51.9017915],[-2.0155768,51.9015459],[-2.015207,51.9015343],[-2.0142778,51.9014401],[-2.0139981,51.9014117],[-2.0128886,51.9013096],[-2.0111499,51.9011665],[-2.0114008,51.9005227],[-2.0123415,51.8993617],[-2.0125584,51.8989311],[-2.0126859,51.8987108],[-2.0127531,51.8980142],[-2.0126103,51.897019],[-2.0124117,51.8964982],[-2.0123415,51.8963141],[-2.0119935,51.895677],[-2.0119032,51.8954893],[-2.0119418,51.8953932],[-2.0119296,51.8950536],[-2.0120439,51.8946199],[-2.0122712,51.8941445],[-2.0124341,51.8937417],[-2.0125271,51.8933967],[-2.0126317,51.892873],[-2.012956,51.892059],[-2.0129961,51.8916677],[-2.0140185,51.8899816],[-2.0147618,51.8888184],[-2.015326,51.8878943],[-2.0154369,51.8879133],[-2.0154747,51.887821],[-2.0159301,51.8869094],[-2.016296,51.8861761],[-2.0162261,51.8860929],[-2.015876,51.885676],[-2.015443,51.8851209],[-2.0152829,51.8848309],[-2.0150169,51.8844051],[-2.0149539,51.8843043],[-2.015286,51.884051],[-2.015533,51.8838109],[-2.0156139,51.883603],[-2.015436,51.883168],[-2.015418,51.883018],[-2.0152216,51.8828674],[-2.0153379,51.8827459],[-2.015489,51.882641],[-2.0155221,51.8822344],[-2.015549,51.881903],[-2.0156389,51.881796],[-2.015703,51.8813959],[-2.015809,51.8812389],[-2.016006,51.881173],[-2.0162289,51.88116],[-2.016371,51.881118],[-2.016608,51.880683],[-2.016741,51.880613],[-2.017061,51.8801739],[-2.017056,51.8800159],[-2.017176,51.879808],[-2.018003,51.879593],[-2.018311,51.8791089],[-2.018319,51.8789509],[-2.0186662,51.8784721],[-2.0188939,51.8782999],[-2.019081,51.878146],[-2.0191828,51.8780771],[-2.0193459,51.8779707],[-2.0195651,51.8777699],[-2.0198594,51.8775729],[-2.020068,51.8772908],[-2.0203531,51.8769326],[-2.0205175,51.8767514],[-2.0204358,51.8766843],[-2.0205217,51.8766619],[-2.0203179,51.876518],[-2.0205403,51.8763556],[-2.020728,51.8761786],[-2.0209956,51.8758072],[-2.021482,51.8758925],[-2.0219845,51.8759798],[-2.022151,51.8756919],[-2.0221495,51.8755769],[-2.0210798,51.8751742],[-2.0210399,51.8749948],[-2.020824,51.874761],[-2.020749,51.874748],[-2.0206879,51.874388],[-2.0207459,51.874289],[-2.020713,51.87413],[-2.0205609,51.874001],[-2.0204459,51.8737439],[-2.0202879,51.873523],[-2.020109,51.8734009],[-2.019993,51.8730399],[-2.0190509,51.872095],[-2.0189029,51.8719929],[-2.0184579,51.871496],[-2.018094,51.8712514],[-2.0177959,51.8710729],[-2.0173959,51.870876],[-2.017388,51.870818],[-2.017084,51.870621],[-2.016856,51.8704239],[-2.016688,51.8701939],[-2.0166759,51.870061],[-2.016643,51.8700229],[-2.016536,51.870016],[-2.016593,51.869484],[-2.016523,51.869026],[-2.016183,51.868489],[-2.016051,51.868416],[-2.016004,51.8683109],[-2.015776,51.868228],[-2.0155405,51.8680849],[-2.0159859,51.867996],[-2.0161532,51.8677912],[-2.0161111,51.8677056],[-2.0160253,51.8672353],[-2.0160038,51.8665595],[-2.0159394,51.866215],[-2.0158429,51.8660693],[-2.0157141,51.865897],[-2.0158536,51.8657579],[-2.0160682,51.8657446],[-2.016154,51.8656916],[-2.0176775,51.8659169],[-2.0181817,51.8659103],[-2.0188362,51.8657778],[-2.0195765,51.865526],[-2.0199949,51.8651815],[-2.0200683,51.8651658],[-2.0230312,51.8645322],[-2.0252399,51.8642173],[-2.0252708,51.8643268],[-2.0254103,51.8643666],[-2.0259145,51.8643699],[-2.0264832,51.8644858],[-2.0269123,51.8645753],[-2.0269231,51.864668],[-2.027084,51.8646846],[-2.0274702,51.8648569],[-2.0275775,51.8649463],[-2.028114,51.8650821],[-2.0281356,51.8649836],[-2.0289167,51.8647415],[-2.0298999,51.8644725],[-2.0308073,51.8642621],[-2.0319396,51.8641241],[-2.0331893,51.8641365],[-2.033264,51.8640979],[-2.034199,51.864018],[-2.0353839,51.8641829],[-2.035868,51.864136],[-2.035983,51.864091],[-2.036083,51.8641529],[-2.03647,51.8641659],[-2.0366334,51.8641694],[-2.0370948,51.862957],[-2.036964,51.862954],[-2.037046,51.862334],[-2.037008,51.862043],[-2.036993,51.861601],[-2.0401847,51.859929],[-2.0383639,51.858871],[-2.0381309,51.858634],[-2.038416,51.8582439],[-2.038748,51.858033],[-2.038783,51.857936],[-2.039144,51.857703],[-2.0395047,51.857461],[-2.0402322,51.8570357],[-2.0403275,51.8569404],[-2.0403583,51.8569096],[-2.0444762,51.8550057],[-2.0449804,51.8546942],[-2.045666,51.854108],[-2.046463,51.8533659],[-2.046899,51.852969],[-2.047041,51.852911],[-2.0473126,51.8528814],[-2.0473075,51.8528465],[-2.0472831,51.8528025],[-2.0473313,51.8527878],[-2.0474602,51.8527485],[-2.0476026,51.8527183],[-2.0476564,51.8527228],[-2.0476343,51.8528116],[-2.0475822,51.8530998],[-2.047592,51.8533919],[-2.0476679,51.8537189],[-2.0478105,51.854363],[-2.0486024,51.855962],[-2.0495465,51.8579936],[-2.0498206,51.8581629],[-2.050954,51.859616],[-2.0511683,51.8600033],[-2.0519249,51.859791],[-2.0522859,51.860191],[-2.0525859,51.860406],[-2.053413,51.861024],[-2.054113,51.861458],[-2.054706,51.861656],[-2.055256,51.862008],[-2.055585,51.862258],[-2.055989,51.862883],[-2.0568589,51.863398],[-2.0571579,51.863528],[-2.0583809,51.8644129],[-2.0587839,51.8646879],[-2.059506,51.8650289],[-2.060346,51.8651179],[-2.061248,51.8650429],[-2.061816,51.8651179],[-2.0621801,51.8650531],[-2.062591,51.86498],[-2.0627863,51.8649582],[-2.063523,51.864876],[-2.0637159,51.8647559],[-2.0640629,51.8647549],[-2.0643229,51.8648139],[-2.0652859,51.864791],[-2.0665789,51.865026],[-2.0675968,51.8651765],[-2.0688379,51.865454],[-2.0690569,51.865485],[-2.069234,51.86551],[-2.070083,51.865425],[-2.0705479,51.865228],[-2.0708118,51.8651833],[-2.0711242,51.8650292],[-2.0712011,51.8649972],[-2.0713943,51.8649475],[-2.0717376,51.8648912],[-2.0719253,51.8649243],[-2.0721506,51.8649475],[-2.0723008,51.864931],[-2.0725422,51.8647985],[-2.0727055,51.8647069],[-2.0727193,51.8646991],[-2.0728963,51.8646759],[-2.0730036,51.8646626],[-2.073127,51.864603],[-2.073304,51.8645633],[-2.0736098,51.8645268],[-2.0737385,51.864497],[-2.0737922,51.864444],[-2.0738994,51.8644042],[-2.0740818,51.8643579],[-2.0743179,51.8643214],[-2.0747524,51.8642817],[-2.0751333,51.8642452],[-2.0752513,51.8642452],[-2.0756161,51.8642386],[-2.075895,51.8642607],[-2.0763295,51.8643214],[-2.0765859,51.8643475],[-2.0767533,51.8643645],[-2.0773852,51.8644409],[-2.0775168,51.8643799],[-2.077617,51.864328],[-2.0777439,51.8642761],[-2.0779549,51.864169],[-2.0780569,51.8640664],[-2.0780676,51.8639438],[-2.0781266,51.8637318],[-2.0782393,51.8634999],[-2.0782944,51.8634337],[-2.0783633,51.8633664],[-2.078492,51.8633274],[-2.0786661,51.8632776],[-2.0787619,51.8632245],[-2.0787921,51.8631085],[-2.0788672,51.8630621],[-2.0789374,51.8630095],[-2.0790121,51.8629197],[-2.0790661,51.8628287],[-2.0791355,51.8626116],[-2.0792749,51.8621776],[-2.0793412,51.861981],[-2.0794156,51.8616763],[-2.0793876,51.8615747],[-2.0794055,51.8614799],[-2.0794497,51.8613872],[-2.0795866,51.8611682],[-2.0798918,51.8606305],[-2.0801512,51.8600788],[-2.0802055,51.8599526],[-2.0802244,51.8598023],[-2.0801547,51.8594279],[-2.0800768,51.8591663],[-2.0799616,51.8588779],[-2.0799039,51.858786],[-2.0796756,51.8584626],[-2.0795405,51.8583411],[-2.0794346,51.858253],[-2.0792579,51.8581618],[-2.079191,51.8581501],[-2.079133,51.8581049],[-2.079056,51.8580722],[-2.0788264,51.8578127],[-2.0787068,51.8577061],[-2.078503,51.8576332],[-2.0781151,51.8575798],[-2.0780779,51.8575917],[-2.0777021,51.8576974],[-2.0772164,51.8578189],[-2.0763647,51.8580208],[-2.0757426,51.8581517],[-2.0752581,51.8582437],[-2.0746348,51.8584115],[-2.0745906,51.8582829],[-2.0745439,51.8581645],[-2.0745098,51.8580562],[-2.0745035,51.8579011],[-2.0745363,51.8577499],[-2.0746486,51.8574164],[-2.0747344,51.857181],[-2.0748442,51.8569659],[-2.0749779,51.8567446],[-2.075171,51.8564142],[-2.0754688,51.8559731],[-2.0755445,51.8559131],[-2.0756593,51.8558437],[-2.076029,51.8557229],[-2.0766486,51.8555164],[-2.0774422,51.8552093],[-2.0777804,51.8550652],[-2.0782687,51.8548002],[-2.0788352,51.854437],[-2.0790056,51.8543193],[-2.0791898,51.8541518],[-2.0793765,51.8540193],[-2.0794282,51.8539538],[-2.0796301,51.8536397],[-2.0797954,51.8533568],[-2.0799166,51.8531503],[-2.0800856,51.8528744],[-2.0804667,51.852247],[-2.0806496,51.8519204],[-2.0807001,51.8518058],[-2.0807216,51.8517279],[-2.0807342,51.8516126],[-2.0807279,51.8513694],[-2.0807052,51.8511839],[-2.0806837,51.8508659],[-2.080685,51.8507147],[-2.0807216,51.8505744],[-2.0808802,51.8500708],[-2.0811702,51.8495131],[-2.0814702,51.8496988],[-2.0823468,51.8501192],[-2.0825222,51.8502689],[-2.0827745,51.8504832],[-2.0833053,51.8509291],[-2.0835707,51.851152],[-2.0836527,51.8512234],[-2.0840428,51.8515628],[-2.0848275,51.8522283],[-2.0849827,51.8523304],[-2.0855455,51.8525259],[-2.0864881,51.8528361],[-2.0873589,51.8531282],[-2.0892413,51.8537597],[-2.0903239,51.8541439],[-2.0908393,51.8542985],[-2.0915585,51.8545853],[-2.0922032,51.8548347],[-2.0925193,51.8549581],[-2.0927431,51.8550455],[-2.093566,51.8553685],[-2.0942478,51.8556185],[-2.0942675,51.8556257],[-2.0946473,51.8557582],[-2.0949829,51.8558595],[-2.0953495,51.8559596],[-2.0954382,51.8559838],[-2.0959703,51.8560845],[-2.0964595,51.8561587],[-2.0969182,51.8562267],[-2.0976821,51.8563587],[-2.09771,51.856367],[-2.0977915,51.8563912],[-2.0981364,51.8564936],[-2.0983168,51.8565481],[-2.0984304,51.8565584],[-2.0984999,51.8565135],[-2.0985342,51.8564026],[-2.0985977,51.8562814],[-2.0986644,51.8561728],[-2.0987188,51.8561049],[-2.0987149,51.8559747],[-2.0987111,51.855913],[-2.0986569,51.8557216],[-2.0986199,51.8555375],[-2.0985558,51.8553801],[-2.0983661,51.8551705],[-2.0981543,51.8548987],[-2.098021,51.8547085],[-2.0978648,51.8544243],[-2.0978208,51.8542298],[-2.0977472,51.8540894],[-2.0976939,51.8538093],[-2.0975955,51.8535473],[-2.0975405,51.8533958],[-2.0974499,51.8531784],[-2.0974051,51.8530317],[-2.097312,51.8527504],[-2.0972691,51.8525012],[-2.0971386,51.8520731],[-2.0970974,51.8517643],[-2.0969936,51.8516131],[-2.0970002,51.851456],[-2.096991,51.8513777],[-2.0970063,51.8512893],[-2.0971249,51.8510916],[-2.0972519,51.8509213],[-2.0975523,51.8507623],[-2.0976982,51.8506509],[-2.0978114,51.8505604],[-2.09782,51.8503908],[-2.0979144,51.8502741],[-2.0979144,51.8500727],[-2.0979487,51.8500303],[-2.0979916,51.8498977],[-2.0980259,51.8497705],[-2.0980466,51.8497177],[-2.0980638,51.8496434],[-2.098081,51.8495533],[-2.0981925,51.849373],[-2.0983385,51.8492299],[-2.0985101,51.8490125],[-2.0986989,51.8488004],[-2.0989822,51.8485459],[-2.099171,51.8483763],[-2.0994457,51.8482331],[-2.0997089,51.848094],[-2.0998319,51.8479945],[-2.0999052,51.8479418],[-2.1000087,51.8478801],[-2.1002103,51.8477605],[-2.1002954,51.8476976],[-2.1003914,51.8476089],[-2.1005075,51.8475293],[-2.1005694,51.8474674],[-2.1006442,51.8473652],[-2.1007589,51.8472257],[-2.1008884,51.8470892],[-2.1009874,51.8469448],[-2.1010765,51.8468386],[-2.1012052,51.8466795],[-2.1013597,51.8465841],[-2.1013969,51.8465573],[-2.1014996,51.846536],[-2.1016537,51.8465205],[-2.1018897,51.8465072],[-2.1021125,51.8464751],[-2.1022481,51.8464137],[-2.1024669,51.8461652],[-2.102527,51.8460486],[-2.1027062,51.8458044],[-2.1028653,51.8455891],[-2.1030104,51.8453754],[-2.1030313,51.8453378],[-2.1028788,51.8453013],[-2.1029905,51.8452214],[-2.103145,51.8451259],[-2.1033178,51.8450384],[-2.1034233,51.8449898],[-2.103531,51.844959],[-2.1037106,51.844915],[-2.1039015,51.84491],[-2.1041039,51.8448941],[-2.1041823,51.8449027],[-2.1044966,51.8448992],[-2.1046937,51.8448645],[-2.1048273,51.8448032],[-2.1049306,51.844736],[-2.1050247,51.8446858],[-2.1052307,51.8445108],[-2.1053337,51.8443995],[-2.1054109,51.8443146],[-2.1054438,51.8442465],[-2.1054313,51.8441712],[-2.1054405,51.8440968],[-2.1055,51.8440675],[-2.1057102,51.8439638],[-2.1059085,51.8438591],[-2.1067093,51.8437054],[-2.1073258,51.8436934],[-2.1077537,51.8437141],[-2.108132,51.8436358],[-2.1085437,51.843551],[-2.1088868,51.8435031],[-2.1090774,51.8434461],[-2.1092975,51.8433967],[-2.109451,51.8433595],[-2.1093812,51.8433181],[-2.1091094,51.8432576],[-2.1088679,51.8432028],[-2.1083508,51.8431402],[-2.1080713,51.8430554],[-2.1078145,51.8429493],[-2.1075598,51.8428357],[-2.1075014,51.8428091],[-2.1074723,51.8428025],[-2.1073738,51.8427803],[-2.1072512,51.8427111],[-2.1070037,51.8426649],[-2.106706,51.8426462],[-2.1064538,51.8426671],[-2.1062962,51.8426324],[-2.1060615,51.8425091],[-2.1058934,51.8424233],[-2.105751,51.8423706],[-2.1055887,51.8423309],[-2.1054859,51.8423122],[-2.1053844,51.8423071],[-2.105187,51.8423406],[-2.1049877,51.8423652],[-2.1047683,51.84239],[-2.1046882,51.8424052],[-2.104585,51.8424248],[-2.1044552,51.8424458],[-2.1043063,51.8424589],[-2.1042093,51.8424852],[-2.1039003,51.8425435],[-2.1037544,51.8425965],[-2.1034767,51.8426498],[-2.103336,51.8426745],[-2.103173,51.8427295],[-2.1030408,51.8427406],[-2.1027774,51.842764],[-2.1026042,51.8428034],[-2.1023553,51.842814],[-2.1020292,51.8428352],[-2.1019176,51.8428617],[-2.1017288,51.842973],[-2.1015399,51.8430473],[-2.1012395,51.8431692],[-2.1010164,51.8432435],[-2.1005962,51.843335],[-2.1003188,51.843403],[-2.0999446,51.8433642],[-2.0995409,51.8433273],[-2.098845,51.8434017],[-2.0983366,51.8434726],[-2.0980082,51.8435853],[-2.0977295,51.8436469],[-2.0975527,51.8437115],[-2.0973437,51.8438051],[-2.0971532,51.8438659],[-2.0969394,51.8439381],[-2.0966733,51.8439647],[-2.0964596,51.8439838],[-2.0963128,51.8439647],[-2.0962427,51.8439126],[-2.0960634,51.8438119],[-2.0960648,51.8437369],[-2.0960289,51.8436906],[-2.0960041,51.8436365],[-2.0960146,51.8435835],[-2.0959876,51.8435211],[-2.096009,51.8434868],[-2.0960573,51.8434403],[-2.0961056,51.8433973],[-2.0963061,51.8432066],[-2.096417,51.8431364],[-2.0968376,51.8428051],[-2.0968831,51.8427699],[-2.0969413,51.8427216],[-2.0969572,51.8426625],[-2.0971023,51.842517],[-2.0972748,51.8423534],[-2.0973918,51.8422349],[-2.0975377,51.8420651],[-2.0976684,51.8418505],[-2.0978046,51.8415854],[-2.097993,51.8412592],[-2.0980178,51.8412162],[-2.0981205,51.8409996],[-2.0982122,51.8407143],[-2.0983076,51.8403096],[-2.0984589,51.8401007],[-2.0985311,51.8400301],[-2.0988746,51.8400556],[-2.0990789,51.8400113],[-2.099188,51.839929],[-2.0995463,51.8396366],[-2.0998441,51.839423],[-2.1000951,51.839188],[-2.100163,51.839093],[-2.1001679,51.8390161],[-2.100281,51.8388321],[-2.1004462,51.8385044],[-2.1005679,51.8383284],[-2.100557,51.8382102],[-2.1007157,51.8380423],[-2.1007461,51.8379524],[-2.1008179,51.8378959],[-2.1008396,51.8378046],[-2.1008939,51.8376179],[-2.1010374,51.8375172],[-2.101458,51.837308],[-2.101596,51.8372129],[-2.1016859,51.837151],[-2.101704,51.837021],[-2.1017829,51.836918],[-2.1018055,51.8368906],[-2.1017965,51.8368619],[-2.1017747,51.836815],[-2.1017591,51.8367836],[-2.1017598,51.8367127],[-2.1017634,51.8366616],[-2.1017546,51.8365907],[-2.1018472,51.8365683],[-2.1019511,51.8365502],[-2.1020324,51.8365207],[-2.1021491,51.8364725],[-2.1022885,51.8364028],[-2.1023941,51.8363503],[-2.1024854,51.8363162],[-2.1026033,51.8362757],[-2.1027694,51.8362332],[-2.1030025,51.8361724],[-2.1030947,51.8361233],[-2.1031696,51.8360752],[-2.1032803,51.8360029],[-2.1033652,51.8359539],[-2.1034149,51.8359381],[-2.1035159,51.8359175],[-2.1035793,51.8358997],[-2.1036756,51.835856],[-2.10375,51.8358073],[-2.1038092,51.8357666],[-2.1038549,51.8357457],[-2.1039443,51.8357156],[-2.1039669,51.8357078],[-2.1040071,51.8356845],[-2.1040945,51.8356616],[-2.1041958,51.8356193],[-2.1043218,51.8355253],[-2.1045436,51.8354501],[-2.1046914,51.8353735],[-2.10485,51.8352956],[-2.1049653,51.8352809],[-2.1050542,51.8352485],[-2.1057919,51.8347586],[-2.1059412,51.834672],[-2.1060296,51.8346018],[-2.1060742,51.8345383],[-2.1065161,51.8343548],[-2.106991,51.8341705],[-2.1076504,51.8339141],[-2.1078671,51.8338448],[-2.1081008,51.8337916],[-2.1082253,51.8337916],[-2.1084127,51.8338198],[-2.1085573,51.8338296],[-2.1090122,51.8338068],[-2.109524,51.8337944],[-2.1098252,51.8337695],[-2.1099611,51.833742],[-2.1100458,51.8337097],[-2.1103154,51.8337648],[-2.1105805,51.8337797],[-2.1113891,51.8340557],[-2.1119336,51.8342634],[-2.1121716,51.8343315],[-2.1125288,51.8343261],[-2.1127933,51.8343315],[-2.1127492,51.8342716],[-2.112423,51.8341408],[-2.1122286,51.8341035],[-2.1118879,51.8339336],[-2.1116293,51.8336967],[-2.1115447,51.8335931],[-2.1114618,51.8334188],[-2.1113034,51.8331661],[-2.1111615,51.8330043],[-2.1110925,51.8328864],[-2.110991,51.832771],[-2.1108695,51.8326638],[-2.110708,51.832594],[-2.110603,51.832463],[-2.11045,51.8323439],[-2.110436,51.832221],[-2.1104712,51.8321425],[-2.1104689,51.831899],[-2.110733,51.8313329],[-2.110619,51.8310209],[-2.110621,51.830784],[-2.1106775,51.8305292],[-2.110734,51.830381],[-2.110818,51.8300689],[-2.1108227,51.8298842],[-2.1110111,51.8295332],[-2.1112357,51.8295184],[-2.1114209,51.8295965],[-2.1115565,51.8300171],[-2.111628,51.8304198],[-2.1117152,51.8305324],[-2.1119196,51.8301724],[-2.11225,51.8295652],[-2.1121674,51.8293772],[-2.1121326,51.8290145],[-2.1122195,51.8285362],[-2.1122326,51.8281708],[-2.1123065,51.8279774],[-2.1124934,51.8278135],[-2.1128803,51.8276791],[-2.1137585,51.8274319],[-2.1143019,51.827303],[-2.1149714,51.8271525],[-2.1154057,51.8269087],[-2.1151181,51.8265511],[-2.1151702,51.8263093],[-2.1149181,51.8256268],[-2.1149355,51.8252722],[-2.1150572,51.8248315],[-2.1154919,51.8242672],[-2.1157267,51.82402],[-2.115831,51.8238911],[-2.1159875,51.8238427],[-2.1162316,51.8237412],[-2.1167191,51.8236295],[-2.117071,51.8233801],[-2.1171624,51.8232954],[-2.1172083,51.8232528],[-2.1172512,51.8231944],[-2.11744,51.82303],[-2.117689,51.8228814],[-2.1179122,51.8228075],[-2.1181872,51.8227121],[-2.1187361,51.8226162],[-2.1190708,51.822595],[-2.1194142,51.8225631],[-2.1197738,51.8225812],[-2.1200957,51.8225812],[-2.1203532,51.8226077],[-2.1206965,51.8226409],[-2.1210398,51.8226674],[-2.1214569,51.822648],[-2.1218002,51.8225525],[-2.1220234,51.8224623],[-2.122444,51.8223934],[-2.122813,51.8222979],[-2.1229933,51.822266],[-2.1230705,51.8222501],[-2.1231993,51.8222289],[-2.1233881,51.822213],[-2.1235684,51.8222289],[-2.1237314,51.8222077],[-2.1239374,51.8221334],[-2.1241005,51.822091],[-2.124255,51.822091],[-2.1243666,51.8221122],[-2.1244953,51.8221971],[-2.1245983,51.8222766],[-2.1246842,51.8222713],[-2.1248215,51.8222289],[-2.1249502,51.822213],[-2.1250704,51.8221971],[-2.1252506,51.8222077],[-2.1253622,51.8221705],[-2.1254738,51.822091],[-2.1257485,51.8220114],[-2.1259459,51.821953],[-2.1260403,51.8219583],[-2.1261948,51.8219318],[-2.1263321,51.8218894],[-2.1265123,51.8218734],[-2.1266926,51.821831],[-2.1267784,51.8217939],[-2.1269243,51.8217355],[-2.1270874,51.8216612],[-2.1272247,51.8215817],[-2.1274908,51.8215286],[-2.1277483,51.8214862],[-2.1279629,51.8214809],[-2.128126,51.8214809],[-2.1284521,51.8214756],[-2.1286667,51.8214119],[-2.1289843,51.8213376],[-2.1291474,51.8213376],[-2.1292847,51.8213217],[-2.1295422,51.8212262],[-2.1296452,51.8211785],[-2.1297911,51.8210299],[-2.1298855,51.8209185],[-2.1299799,51.8207752],[-2.1300657,51.8207593],[-2.1301859,51.8207222],[-2.1303146,51.8207381],[-2.1304606,51.8207752],[-2.1306837,51.8207912],[-2.1308125,51.8208336],[-2.1308897,51.8208548],[-2.1310356,51.8208548],[-2.1312245,51.8208283],[-2.1313189,51.820823],[-2.1314905,51.820823],[-2.1316193,51.8208336],[-2.131851,51.8208867],[-2.1320742,51.820876],[-2.1322802,51.820892],[-2.1324862,51.8209132],[-2.1326664,51.820945],[-2.1327608,51.8209397],[-2.1328552,51.8209556],[-2.1329668,51.8209875],[-2.1331213,51.821014],[-2.1333187,51.8210246],[-2.1334217,51.8210405],[-2.1334732,51.821067],[-2.1335762,51.8211148],[-2.1337307,51.8211519],[-2.1339539,51.8211519],[-2.1341599,51.8211997],[-2.1343487,51.8212262],[-2.1345204,51.8212315],[-2.1347864,51.821205],[-2.1349667,51.8211997],[-2.1351298,51.8212103],[-2.1353443,51.8212315],[-2.1356018,51.8213005],[-2.1357735,51.8213323],[-2.1359709,51.8214066],[-2.1360246,51.8214254],[-2.1361683,51.8214756],[-2.1363571,51.8215233],[-2.1366661,51.8215764],[-2.1369507,51.8216263],[-2.1371725,51.8216559],[-2.1374901,51.8216559],[-2.1377304,51.8217355],[-2.1378197,51.8217921],[-2.1380021,51.8218451],[-2.1381202,51.8218982],[-2.1382167,51.8219181],[-2.1383776,51.8219512],[-2.1385386,51.8220043],[-2.1387518,51.822022],[-2.139035,51.8220697],[-2.1395929,51.8221599],[-2.1398075,51.8222024],[-2.1399878,51.822266],[-2.1401852,51.8223032],[-2.1403483,51.8223085],[-2.1404083,51.8223244],[-2.1405771,51.8223425],[-2.1407594,51.822369],[-2.1409097,51.8223889],[-2.1410813,51.822369],[-2.1413495,51.822369],[-2.141489,51.8223624],[-2.1417143,51.8223226],[-2.1418431,51.8222961],[-2.1420898,51.8222563],[-2.14224,51.8222165],[-2.142358,51.8221966],[-2.1424653,51.8222032],[-2.1426048,51.82219],[-2.1428301,51.8221767],[-2.1429803,51.8221767],[-2.1431734,51.8221568],[-2.143388,51.8221369],[-2.1436884,51.8221236],[-2.1438815,51.8221236],[-2.1440317,51.8221502],[-2.1442034,51.8221568],[-2.1444287,51.82219],[-2.1446218,51.8222165],[-2.1448579,51.8222762],[-2.1450724,51.8223292],[-2.145287,51.8223889],[-2.1454638,51.8224252],[-2.1456113,51.8224768],[-2.1457982,51.822544],[-2.145946,51.8225978],[-2.1461247,51.8226639],[-2.1463307,51.8227064],[-2.1467169,51.8228231],[-2.1470516,51.8229451],[-2.147352,51.8230618],[-2.1475752,51.8230989],[-2.1476826,51.8231956],[-2.1478114,51.8232699],[-2.1479487,51.8233494],[-2.1481375,51.8234449],[-2.1483092,51.8235404],[-2.1484036,51.8236465],[-2.1485323,51.8237155],[-2.1486611,51.8237844],[-2.1488671,51.8238534],[-2.1490387,51.8238852],[-2.1492245,51.8239075],[-2.1494164,51.8239595],[-2.1495451,51.8240179],[-2.1496751,51.82406],[-2.1498146,51.8241595],[-2.1498575,51.8242855],[-2.149836,51.8243849],[-2.1497073,51.8244579],[-2.1494927,51.8245242],[-2.1494069,51.824564],[-2.1492674,51.824617],[-2.1490207,51.8250016],[-2.1490636,51.8251674],[-2.1491494,51.8253266],[-2.1492781,51.8254592],[-2.149364,51.8255653],[-2.1495356,51.8256515],[-2.1496825,51.8258534],[-2.1498713,51.8259701],[-2.1501374,51.8260072],[-2.1503176,51.8260762],[-2.1504035,51.8261876],[-2.1503777,51.8263945],[-2.1503005,51.8265536],[-2.1503176,51.8266756],[-2.1504635,51.8268825],[-2.1506409,51.8269308],[-2.1508383,51.8270369],[-2.1510271,51.8271536],[-2.1512674,51.8272968],[-2.1515507,51.8273923],[-2.1518425,51.8274825],[-2.1519712,51.8275727],[-2.1522373,51.8276682],[-2.1524347,51.8277477],[-2.152512,51.8278644],[-2.152718,51.8280023],[-2.1528553,51.8281031],[-2.1530441,51.8282092],[-2.1531471,51.8282676],[-2.1533789,51.8283471],[-2.1534475,51.8284161],[-2.1537136,51.8286283],[-2.1538767,51.8288245],[-2.1539625,51.8290155],[-2.1540569,51.8293285],[-2.1539625,51.8295778],[-2.1540054,51.8297316],[-2.1541943,51.8298907],[-2.1542972,51.8300392],[-2.1544775,51.8302885],[-2.1544861,51.8303575],[-2.1545805,51.8304583],[-2.1546445,51.8306378],[-2.1547157,51.8309495],[-2.1546492,51.831307],[-2.1547178,51.8314873],[-2.1547779,51.8316623],[-2.1548895,51.8317949],[-2.1549776,51.8319043],[-2.1550769,51.8319597],[-2.1551278,51.831988],[-2.1553223,51.8320303],[-2.1555302,51.8320585],[-2.1559109,51.8320654],[-2.1566419,51.8319611],[-2.1570884,51.8318612],[-2.1572327,51.8318055],[-2.1573907,51.8317503],[-2.1576068,51.8317435],[-2.1577476,51.831726],[-2.1578511,51.831694],[-2.1579708,51.831657],[-2.1581646,51.8316476],[-2.1583105,51.8316529],[-2.1584429,51.8316517],[-2.1587139,51.8316422],[-2.1588856,51.8316369],[-2.159143,51.8316316],[-2.1592117,51.8316422],[-2.1592975,51.8316104],[-2.1593576,51.8315521],[-2.1593027,51.8314767],[-2.1591667,51.8313734],[-2.1588793,51.8312774],[-2.1586712,51.8312322],[-2.1584135,51.8310004],[-2.1582676,51.8309315],[-2.1581131,51.8308838],[-2.1580187,51.8308148],[-2.1579672,51.8307246],[-2.1580015,51.8306238],[-2.1580787,51.8305072],[-2.1581474,51.8304064],[-2.1582075,51.8303321],[-2.1582247,51.8302738],[-2.1582418,51.8302048],[-2.1582332,51.8301306],[-2.1582676,51.8300881],[-2.1584478,51.8299714],[-2.1585422,51.8299131],[-2.1586538,51.8298388],[-2.1587566,51.8297699],[-2.1589199,51.8296691],[-2.1591173,51.8295259],[-2.1592375,51.8294039],[-2.1593662,51.8292872],[-2.159495,51.8291811],[-2.159598,51.8291121],[-2.1597095,51.8290485],[-2.1598039,51.8290591],[-2.1598499,51.8290622],[-2.159936,51.8290697],[-2.1599378,51.8290678],[-2.1600099,51.8289636],[-2.1600958,51.828762],[-2.16007,51.8286612],[-2.1600786,51.828587],[-2.1601301,51.8284915],[-2.1602588,51.828396],[-2.1602846,51.8282528],[-2.1603189,51.8281732],[-2.1604048,51.8280671],[-2.1604648,51.8279451],[-2.1605249,51.8278284],[-2.1605764,51.8277329],[-2.1606451,51.8276162],[-2.1607309,51.8275579],[-2.1608339,51.8274942],[-2.160894,51.8273563],[-2.1610657,51.8271654],[-2.1611687,51.8270699],[-2.1612459,51.8269691],[-2.1613317,51.8268577],[-2.1613746,51.8267251],[-2.1614004,51.8266137],[-2.1614862,51.8265076],[-2.161512,51.8264651],[-2.1615377,51.8263484],[-2.1615806,51.8262795],[-2.1616345,51.8262164],[-2.1616829,51.8261436],[-2.1617722,51.826093],[-2.1618382,51.8260081],[-2.1618973,51.8259679],[-2.1619655,51.8258821],[-2.1621034,51.8258845],[-2.1622072,51.8258816],[-2.1623874,51.8258392],[-2.162499,51.8258392],[-2.1626193,51.8258371],[-2.1626902,51.8258304],[-2.1627408,51.8258086],[-2.162792,51.8257627],[-2.1628266,51.8257006],[-2.1628464,51.8255883],[-2.1630483,51.8255739],[-2.1632629,51.8254997],[-2.1633659,51.8254466],[-2.1634174,51.825383],[-2.1634689,51.8252822],[-2.1635719,51.8252185],[-2.163632,51.8251602],[-2.1636663,51.8250541],[-2.1636921,51.8249002],[-2.1637264,51.8247623],[-2.1637436,51.8246403],[-2.1637865,51.8245978],[-2.1638637,51.8245554],[-2.1639582,51.8244917],[-2.1640526,51.8244493],[-2.1640955,51.8244334],[-2.1641899,51.8243856],[-2.1643186,51.8243485],[-2.1644817,51.8243379],[-2.1645847,51.8243538],[-2.1647049,51.8243856],[-2.1647907,51.8243909],[-2.1649624,51.8243962],[-2.1650911,51.8243856],[-2.1652027,51.8243591],[-2.16534,51.8243326],[-2.1654945,51.8243167],[-2.1656404,51.824322],[-2.165752,51.8243167],[-2.1659323,51.8242848],[-2.1661039,51.8242689],[-2.1662498,51.8242689],[-2.1664387,51.8242424],[-2.1665159,51.8242106],[-2.1666103,51.824184],[-2.1667305,51.8241628],[-2.1667562,51.8241151],[-2.1668563,51.8239759],[-2.1669536,51.8238703],[-2.1670395,51.8237915],[-2.1671339,51.8237543],[-2.1672111,51.823696],[-2.1672884,51.8236482],[-2.1673249,51.8236332],[-2.1673656,51.8236164],[-2.1674171,51.8235899],[-2.16746,51.8235527],[-2.1674944,51.8235103],[-2.1675373,51.8234519],[-2.1675802,51.8233936],[-2.1675974,51.8233405],[-2.1676128,51.8233167],[-2.1676317,51.8232875],[-2.1677175,51.8232185],[-2.1677862,51.8231973],[-2.1678205,51.8231549],[-2.1678291,51.8230859],[-2.1678291,51.8230222],[-2.1678463,51.8229586],[-2.1678806,51.8229108],[-2.1678205,51.82281],[-2.1677948,51.8226933],[-2.1676142,51.8224902],[-2.1668645,51.8219666],[-2.1660576,51.8209598],[-2.1659282,51.8207983],[-2.1658121,51.8205871],[-2.165752,51.8205234],[-2.1657434,51.820412],[-2.1657434,51.8203112],[-2.1657778,51.819977],[-2.1660079,51.8195755],[-2.1660816,51.8193544],[-2.1662962,51.8190626],[-2.1666824,51.8186116],[-2.1670257,51.8182668],[-2.1676265,51.8179484],[-2.1681415,51.8176831],[-2.168914,51.8173117],[-2.169429,51.817073],[-2.1696471,51.816928],[-2.1709628,51.8163101],[-2.1711274,51.8161318],[-2.1722092,51.8158179],[-2.1724337,51.8157933],[-2.172541,51.8158],[-2.1725905,51.8158074],[-2.1728694,51.8156225],[-2.1731743,51.8155895],[-2.1737723,51.815537],[-2.1740887,51.8154165],[-2.1741593,51.8152541],[-2.1744185,51.8151295],[-2.1749186,51.8150942],[-2.1750216,51.8150869],[-2.1754387,51.8149553],[-2.1758004,51.8147743],[-2.1761592,51.8144947],[-2.1764275,51.8143726],[-2.1769127,51.8141168],[-2.177438,51.8139639],[-2.1776566,51.8138104],[-2.1780618,51.8136886],[-2.17823,51.8135889],[-2.1796581,51.8129826],[-2.180141,51.8128186],[-2.1806309,51.8126607],[-2.1812411,51.8124666],[-2.1815409,51.8123564],[-2.1817153,51.8121493],[-2.1818296,51.8120492],[-2.1821666,51.8117539],[-2.1830449,51.8109558],[-2.1834751,51.8105002],[-2.1838442,51.8102084],[-2.1842885,51.8099195],[-2.1847454,51.8096512],[-2.1855093,51.8091895],[-2.1863762,51.8086694],[-2.1868961,51.8083421],[-2.187527,51.8079716],[-2.1880341,51.8076744],[-2.1885107,51.8073621],[-2.1896635,51.8066793],[-2.1903501,51.8063025],[-2.1908879,51.8060239],[-2.1919771,51.8052136],[-2.1925475,51.8048194],[-2.1931028,51.8044531],[-2.1931641,51.8043897],[-2.1932076,51.8043172],[-2.1933087,51.8041996],[-2.193407,51.8041159],[-2.1935765,51.8040271],[-2.1935367,51.8039783],[-2.1934881,51.8039003],[-2.1934506,51.8038238],[-2.1933977,51.8036872],[-2.1933482,51.8033946],[-2.1933139,51.8032647],[-2.1932878,51.8031656],[-2.1931959,51.8028112],[-2.193086,51.802714],[-2.193036,51.8023129],[-2.1931179,51.801936],[-2.1931256,51.8019177],[-2.193226,51.8016809],[-2.193259,51.8007909],[-2.1931309,51.800221],[-2.1929729,51.799791],[-2.192279,51.7988749],[-2.1920529,51.7987909],[-2.191878,51.7986029],[-2.191746,51.798449],[-2.1917829,51.7982459],[-2.1918679,51.798139],[-2.192324,51.7976559],[-2.1928739,51.796614],[-2.1929339,51.796464],[-2.192941,51.795963],[-2.192793,51.795114],[-2.192681,51.794731],[-2.192656,51.79431],[-2.192723,51.794108],[-2.1926772,51.7936004],[-2.1926991,51.7935409],[-2.1932349,51.7930681],[-2.1938701,51.7925775],[-2.1949812,51.7923807],[-2.1950783,51.7919663],[-2.1951324,51.7916057],[-2.1951274,51.7914992],[-2.1950844,51.7905932],[-2.1950233,51.790404],[-2.1949562,51.7902588],[-2.1947611,51.7898599],[-2.194735,51.7898313],[-2.1947015,51.7898036],[-2.1947171,51.789771],[-2.1947691,51.7896585],[-2.1948374,51.7894277],[-2.1948576,51.7893615],[-2.1948599,51.7892773],[-2.1948505,51.7891894],[-2.1948264,51.7890861],[-2.1947966,51.7890255],[-2.1947431,51.7889496],[-2.1944471,51.7884987],[-2.1943545,51.7883558],[-2.1942733,51.7882242],[-2.1942006,51.7881186],[-2.194086,51.7879521],[-2.1940173,51.7878406],[-2.1939135,51.7877094],[-2.1937529,51.787512],[-2.1935369,51.7871575],[-2.1934244,51.7869555],[-2.1937957,51.7868055],[-2.1939509,51.7867407],[-2.194161,51.7866386],[-2.1942399,51.7865924],[-2.1943954,51.7865012],[-2.1944313,51.7864801],[-2.1950062,51.7860566],[-2.1951172,51.7859794],[-2.1954925,51.7857096],[-2.1959009,51.7854159],[-2.1960817,51.7852786],[-2.196209,51.7853047],[-2.1977978,51.7857676],[-2.1983254,51.7859213],[-2.1990878,51.7861434],[-2.1991974,51.7861391],[-2.1992661,51.7860913],[-2.1993433,51.7860383],[-2.1994034,51.7859852],[-2.1994549,51.7859268],[-2.1995579,51.7858524],[-2.1996437,51.7857675],[-2.1997467,51.7856931],[-2.1998841,51.7856082],[-2.2000471,51.7854914],[-2.2001845,51.785348],[-2.2003132,51.7852153],[-2.2003561,51.7851675],[-2.2004506,51.785125],[-2.2005364,51.7850825],[-2.200751,51.7850401],[-2.2008883,51.7850135],[-2.2009756,51.7849698],[-2.2011016,51.7849183],[-2.2012947,51.7848536],[-2.2014825,51.7847839],[-2.2015791,51.7847425],[-2.2017185,51.7847209],[-2.2019143,51.7846678],[-2.2021423,51.784623],[-2.2022711,51.7846014],[-2.2024079,51.784555],[-2.2025447,51.7844986],[-2.2026171,51.7844621],[-2.2027699,51.784384],[-2.2029256,51.7843094],[-2.2030167,51.7842579],[-2.203124,51.7842098],[-2.2032662,51.7841103],[-2.2033976,51.7840356],[-2.203588,51.7839659],[-2.203706,51.7839211],[-2.2038107,51.7838697],[-2.2039501,51.7838017],[-2.2040762,51.7837585],[-2.2042371,51.7837021],[-2.2044195,51.7836108],[-2.2045322,51.7835544],[-2.2046341,51.783498],[-2.2047038,51.7834565],[-2.2047764,51.78341],[-2.2048884,51.7833895],[-2.2052117,51.7833305],[-2.2059437,51.7832507],[-2.2063729,51.7831923],[-2.2066132,51.7831551],[-2.2069136,51.7831604],[-2.2072305,51.7832391],[-2.2075792,51.7833271],[-2.2076274,51.7833935],[-2.2078381,51.7835747],[-2.2080995,51.7837535],[-2.2082792,51.7838531],[-2.2085278,51.7839527],[-2.2087572,51.7840316],[-2.208797,51.7840578],[-2.2087834,51.7841386],[-2.2089267,51.7840889],[-2.2089859,51.7840334],[-2.2090631,51.7839405],[-2.2091138,51.7838343],[-2.2091456,51.7837586],[-2.209171,51.7836914],[-2.2092396,51.7835533],[-2.2093169,51.7834843],[-2.2094199,51.7834259],[-2.2095572,51.7833994],[-2.2096173,51.7833834],[-2.2096859,51.7833197],[-2.2097803,51.7832294],[-2.2098833,51.7832082],[-2.2101065,51.7831551],[-2.2102868,51.7830914],[-2.2104584,51.7830489],[-2.2105357,51.7830064],[-2.210653,51.7829554],[-2.210879,51.7828737],[-2.2110097,51.782821],[-2.2111451,51.7827728],[-2.2112699,51.7827131],[-2.2113879,51.7826551],[-2.2115227,51.7826135],[-2.2116429,51.7826029],[-2.2118197,51.7825572],[-2.2120558,51.7825339],[-2.2121899,51.7825273],[-2.2122952,51.7825285],[-2.2124926,51.7824754],[-2.2125956,51.7824542],[-2.21269,51.7824383],[-2.2128531,51.7824011],[-2.2130162,51.7823692],[-2.2131621,51.7823055],[-2.2132737,51.7822153],[-2.2134282,51.7820931],[-2.2135998,51.7820082],[-2.2137972,51.7819604],[-2.2140118,51.7819073],[-2.214132,51.7818595],[-2.2142435,51.7817958],[-2.2143723,51.7817161],[-2.2145611,51.7816312],[-2.2147156,51.7815462],[-2.2149903,51.7814294],[-2.2153078,51.7813179],[-2.2153819,51.7812429],[-2.2154023,51.7812223],[-2.2152392,51.7810311],[-2.2150246,51.7807709],[-2.2148787,51.7805904],[-2.2147843,51.780447],[-2.2147328,51.7803886],[-2.2146298,51.7802771],[-2.214604,51.7802505],[-2.2145783,51.7802293],[-2.2148186,51.7801868],[-2.2151276,51.780139],[-2.215428,51.7801019],[-2.2156769,51.7800594],[-2.2160288,51.7799797],[-2.2165696,51.7798682],[-2.217093,51.7797627],[-2.2175758,51.7797329],[-2.218163,51.7796788],[-2.2182364,51.7797471],[-2.2183239,51.7798217],[-2.2188295,51.7802119],[-2.2190676,51.7800863],[-2.2191534,51.7801341],[-2.2192993,51.7801712],[-2.2195568,51.7802137],[-2.2197628,51.780235],[-2.2198563,51.7802481],[-2.2199517,51.7802615],[-2.2201405,51.7802721],[-2.220295,51.780304],[-2.220604,51.7804049],[-2.2207928,51.7804792],[-2.2209387,51.7804898],[-2.221076,51.7805323],[-2.2212906,51.7805483],[-2.2215052,51.7805748],[-2.2217455,51.7806067],[-2.2219172,51.7806332],[-2.2220803,51.7806438],[-2.2223807,51.7806863],[-2.2226769,51.7807202],[-2.2227058,51.7807235],[-2.2229729,51.7808244],[-2.2231531,51.7809093],[-2.223445,51.7810049],[-2.2237196,51.7811271],[-2.2237801,51.7811411],[-2.223857,51.7811589],[-2.2238958,51.7811704],[-2.2240544,51.7812173],[-2.2242174,51.7812917],[-2.2243338,51.7813157],[-2.2244234,51.7813341],[-2.2246294,51.7814722],[-2.2246646,51.7814976],[-2.2246809,51.7815094],[-2.2248,51.7815979],[-2.22488,51.7815552],[-2.2249556,51.7815041],[-2.2250386,51.7814607],[-2.2250672,51.7814457],[-2.2252315,51.7813995],[-2.22527,51.78142],[-2.2253043,51.7814437],[-2.2253344,51.7814509],[-2.2253527,51.7814452],[-2.225371,51.7814329],[-2.2253955,51.7814355],[-2.2254195,51.7814417],[-2.2254508,51.781457],[-2.2254908,51.7814843],[-2.2255372,51.7815537],[-2.2256379,51.781576],[-2.2256787,51.7815817],[-2.2258029,51.7816005],[-2.2259289,51.7816036],[-2.2261232,51.7816362],[-2.2262173,51.7816421],[-2.2264147,51.781605],[-2.2266899,51.7814719],[-2.2268133,51.781379],[-2.2269367,51.7812828],[-2.22706,51.7811832],[-2.2272424,51.7809874],[-2.2273336,51.7808646],[-2.2274516,51.7807617],[-2.2275858,51.780629],[-2.2276716,51.7805759],[-2.2277735,51.7805261],[-2.2279425,51.7804922],[-2.2280966,51.7804497],[-2.2281824,51.7804337],[-2.2282597,51.7804709],[-2.2283283,51.7804975],[-2.2283369,51.78037],[-2.2284228,51.7802373],[-2.2285772,51.780078],[-2.228912,51.7797912],[-2.2291351,51.7795894],[-2.2293243,51.7794302],[-2.2295755,51.7792043],[-2.2298138,51.7790406],[-2.2300637,51.7789447],[-2.2301136,51.7789256],[-2.2303711,51.7787822],[-2.2305857,51.7786442],[-2.2308003,51.7785167],[-2.2310492,51.778368],[-2.2312123,51.7782087],[-2.2313516,51.7780958],[-2.2315354,51.7780132],[-2.2315829,51.7779964],[-2.2318731,51.7778848],[-2.2320963,51.7778104],[-2.2323881,51.7777414],[-2.2325855,51.7777095],[-2.2327915,51.7776883],[-2.2329804,51.7776352],[-2.233049,51.777598],[-2.233152,51.7775662],[-2.2333579,51.7775555],[-2.2336069,51.7774971],[-2.2337958,51.7774759],[-2.2339846,51.7774653],[-2.2341562,51.7775077],[-2.2344395,51.7775024],[-2.2346197,51.7774546],[-2.2348171,51.7774175],[-2.2351261,51.7773378],[-2.2352635,51.7773113],[-2.2353579,51.7772688],[-2.2354695,51.7772422],[-2.235581,51.7772528],[-2.2357012,51.7772688],[-2.2357613,51.777306],[-2.2358385,51.7773537],[-2.2359158,51.7773962],[-2.2360789,51.7774334],[-2.2362162,51.7774493],[-2.2363363,51.77746],[-2.2364651,51.777444],[-2.2367054,51.7773962],[-2.2368084,51.7773856],[-2.2369286,51.777375],[-2.237023,51.7773644],[-2.2370745,51.7773484],[-2.2371603,51.7773431],[-2.2372547,51.7773484],[-2.2373663,51.7773484],[-2.2374521,51.7773272],[-2.2375981,51.7772953],[-2.2377096,51.7772475],[-2.237804,51.7772794],[-2.23795,51.7773484],[-2.2380615,51.777375],[-2.238319,51.7774281],[-2.2385422,51.7774865],[-2.2387482,51.7775343],[-2.2389198,51.7775609],[-2.239143,51.7776352],[-2.2394692,51.7777573],[-2.2396151,51.7778264],[-2.2398554,51.777922],[-2.2400442,51.7779857],[-2.240173,51.7780282],[-2.2403275,51.778076],[-2.2404047,51.7781238],[-2.2404562,51.7781769],[-2.2405249,51.7782247],[-2.2406193,51.7782565],[-2.2407051,51.7783256],[-2.2408682,51.7784105],[-2.2410484,51.7785539],[-2.24116,51.778607],[-2.2412716,51.7787026],[-2.2414347,51.77883],[-2.2415806,51.7789362],[-2.2416922,51.779069],[-2.2418381,51.7792283],[-2.2418896,51.7793717],[-2.2420098,51.7796],[-2.2420698,51.779685],[-2.2421213,51.7797753],[-2.2421814,51.7798496],[-2.2422587,51.779924],[-2.2424046,51.7801204],[-2.2424561,51.7802054],[-2.242499,51.7802851],[-2.2424904,51.7803275],[-2.2424904,51.7803488],[-2.242602,51.780439],[-2.2427221,51.7805452],[-2.2429024,51.7806992],[-2.2429968,51.7807789],[-2.2430741,51.7808479],[-2.2431427,51.7810072],[-2.2433487,51.7813471],[-2.2437607,51.7818356],[-2.2439265,51.7823781],[-2.244061,51.7829188],[-2.2440982,51.7830684],[-2.2442106,51.7833256],[-2.24431,51.7833755],[-2.2443958,51.7834286],[-2.2445503,51.7835401],[-2.2446791,51.7835454],[-2.2448336,51.7835613],[-2.2450567,51.7835932],[-2.245237,51.7836038],[-2.2454922,51.783659],[-2.2456746,51.7836755],[-2.2459321,51.7836457],[-2.246211,51.7836059],[-2.2465007,51.783576],[-2.2468163,51.783556],[-2.2471605,51.7835561],[-2.2474257,51.7835825],[-2.2476317,51.7836091],[-2.2478892,51.7835985],[-2.2481466,51.7835401],[-2.2483011,51.7834923],[-2.2484728,51.7834179],[-2.2484986,51.7833489],[-2.2486616,51.7831418],[-2.2487732,51.7830197],[-2.2489535,51.7828392],[-2.2490736,51.7827117],[-2.2491938,51.7825949],[-2.2496573,51.7822604],[-2.2500263,51.7820745],[-2.2502409,51.781963],[-2.2503697,51.7818781],[-2.2505327,51.7817613],[-2.2507902,51.7816444],[-2.2509276,51.781586],[-2.2510134,51.7815754],[-2.2511336,51.7816232],[-2.251331,51.7815913],[-2.2515325,51.7815881],[-2.2517739,51.7815549],[-2.2520421,51.7815184],[-2.2524382,51.7814427],[-2.252643,51.7814056],[-2.2529017,51.7813842],[-2.2531334,51.7813789],[-2.253348,51.7814002],[-2.2534767,51.781432],[-2.2536398,51.7814108],[-2.2539574,51.7813577],[-2.2542149,51.7813205],[-2.2545044,51.781306],[-2.2548209,51.7813027],[-2.2551535,51.781316],[-2.2554164,51.7812927],[-2.2555773,51.7812795],[-2.2557341,51.7812727],[-2.2560431,51.7813258],[-2.2563176,51.7813558],[-2.2565053,51.7813657],[-2.2567789,51.781379],[-2.257251,51.7813857],[-2.2577768,51.781363],[-2.2579622,51.7813165],[-2.2576211,51.7810106],[-2.2577821,51.7809575],[-2.2578947,51.7809144],[-2.2580235,51.7808746],[-2.258206,51.7808267],[-2.2585277,51.7807186],[-2.2586833,51.7806489],[-2.258812,51.7805958],[-2.2588871,51.780546],[-2.2589891,51.7804564],[-2.2590427,51.7803801],[-2.2591072,51.7802691],[-2.2591931,51.7801895],[-2.2593046,51.7800992],[-2.259399,51.7800142],[-2.259648,51.7798762],[-2.2597681,51.779754],[-2.2598711,51.7797487],[-2.2600342,51.7796797],[-2.2601372,51.7796],[-2.2602574,51.7795257],[-2.2602831,51.779462],[-2.2604119,51.7793345],[-2.2606093,51.7792389],[-2.2608153,51.779138],[-2.2610384,51.779],[-2.2612616,51.7788354],[-2.2613903,51.7786707],[-2.2615191,51.7784902],[-2.2616135,51.778368],[-2.2616821,51.7782459],[-2.2617251,51.7782087],[-2.2618281,51.7782193],[-2.261871,51.7781875],[-2.2619396,51.7780707],[-2.2619311,51.7780388],[-2.2618538,51.77806],[-2.261665,51.7781503],[-2.2616392,51.7781769],[-2.2615534,51.7782034],[-2.2613817,51.7782671],[-2.2612358,51.7782937],[-2.2611071,51.7783096],[-2.2608925,51.7783627],[-2.2607638,51.7783999],[-2.2606093,51.7784318],[-2.2604634,51.7784583],[-2.2602121,51.7784833],[-2.2600084,51.7785114],[-2.2597338,51.7785486],[-2.2595621,51.7785698],[-2.2594248,51.778607],[-2.2591931,51.7787185],[-2.2590427,51.7788202],[-2.2588926,51.778915],[-2.2587811,51.7790371],[-2.258618,51.7791221],[-2.2583948,51.7792124],[-2.2581803,51.7792761],[-2.2579485,51.779292],[-2.2577955,51.7793047],[-2.2574507,51.7793558],[-2.2573649,51.7794089],[-2.2571589,51.7793292],[-2.2569014,51.7792655],[-2.2567726,51.7792708],[-2.2567297,51.7792814],[-2.2566439,51.7793292],[-2.256498,51.7793505],[-2.2561976,51.7793451],[-2.25588,51.7793505],[-2.2555882,51.7793505],[-2.2553908,51.7793239],[-2.2552963,51.779292],[-2.2553049,51.7792389],[-2.2553307,51.7792018],[-2.2553478,51.7791593],[-2.2552792,51.7791327],[-2.2551247,51.7790796],[-2.2549336,51.7790359],[-2.2546955,51.7789947],[-2.2545153,51.7788885],[-2.2544552,51.7788088],[-2.2544123,51.7787822],[-2.254275,51.7787504],[-2.2541119,51.7787822],[-2.2537514,51.7786973],[-2.2534338,51.7786336],[-2.2531334,51.7785645],[-2.2528931,51.7784955],[-2.2527815,51.7784849],[-2.252524,51.7783893],[-2.252318,51.7783309],[-2.2521979,51.7783521],[-2.2521034,51.7783999],[-2.2520176,51.7784211],[-2.2519232,51.7784158],[-2.2517945,51.7784052],[-2.2516743,51.7783893],[-2.251537,51.7783309],[-2.2513224,51.7782778],[-2.2510563,51.7781556],[-2.2507988,51.7780547],[-2.2506272,51.7779804],[-2.2504641,51.7778795],[-2.2502924,51.7777733],[-2.2501208,51.7776671],[-2.2500778,51.777614],[-2.2500178,51.7775609],[-2.2499233,51.7774706],[-2.2498461,51.7773962],[-2.2498118,51.777306],[-2.2497188,51.7770479],[-2.249646,51.7768139],[-2.2496359,51.776508],[-2.2496764,51.7761649],[-2.2495423,51.775677],[-2.2495423,51.7752256],[-2.2495799,51.7751094],[-2.2498856,51.7748472],[-2.2501109,51.7746115],[-2.2502826,51.7744257],[-2.250488,51.7740989],[-2.250248,51.7741849],[-2.249705,51.7743259],[-2.2491209,51.7744889],[-2.248058,51.7748759],[-2.247329,51.7751649],[-2.2463289,51.775504],[-2.2460559,51.775539],[-2.2453657,51.77558],[-2.2453142,51.7756278],[-2.2451769,51.7757287],[-2.2450739,51.7758031],[-2.245031,51.775819],[-2.2449957,51.775809],[-2.2449022,51.7757818],[-2.244722,51.7756756],[-2.2445613,51.7755312],[-2.2443873,51.7754419],[-2.2441555,51.7753251],[-2.2439324,51.7752507],[-2.2438122,51.7752136],[-2.2436234,51.7751658],[-2.2434603,51.7751233],[-2.2433058,51.7750595],[-2.2430483,51.7749746],[-2.2427479,51.7748896],[-2.2425591,51.7748418],[-2.242293,51.7747887],[-2.2420527,51.7747409],[-2.2418553,51.7746984],[-2.2416578,51.7746134],[-2.2415377,51.7745497],[-2.2414004,51.7744594],[-2.2412716,51.7743691],[-2.2411429,51.7742311],[-2.2410227,51.7740664],[-2.2409283,51.7738912],[-2.2407738,51.7736415],[-2.240645,51.7733972],[-2.2404905,51.7731742],[-2.2404047,51.7730467],[-2.2403275,51.7729405],[-2.2401901,51.7727334],[-2.2400185,51.7725369],[-2.2398468,51.7722925],[-2.2397181,51.7720907],[-2.2396237,51.7719048],[-2.2395035,51.7717455],[-2.2392718,51.7715224],[-2.2391173,51.7713631],[-2.2390743,51.7712409],[-2.2391173,51.7711188],[-2.2392748,51.7709652],[-2.2396181,51.7706997],[-2.239764,51.7705828],[-2.2399357,51.7704554],[-2.2401074,51.770381],[-2.2403477,51.7702854],[-2.240588,51.7702004],[-2.2408112,51.7700889],[-2.2411116,51.7700783],[-2.2412489,51.7699667],[-2.2414721,51.7698339],[-2.241618,51.7697011],[-2.2417639,51.7696002],[-2.2419871,51.7694196],[-2.2421845,51.769324],[-2.2423475,51.7692231],[-2.2425192,51.7691488],[-2.2427424,51.7690585],[-2.2428711,51.7689947],[-2.2430084,51.7689097],[-2.2431543,51.7688407],[-2.2433088,51.7687876],[-2.243429,51.7687557],[-2.2435749,51.7687185],[-2.2436093,51.7687079],[-2.2436522,51.7686813],[-2.2437037,51.7686123],[-2.2437637,51.7685432],[-2.2438324,51.7684476],[-2.2439097,51.7683892],[-2.2439869,51.7683255],[-2.2440642,51.7682511],[-2.2441672,51.7681502],[-2.2443131,51.7680015],[-2.2443646,51.7679377],[-2.2444075,51.7678687],[-2.2444761,51.7677677],[-2.244562,51.7676881],[-2.244725,51.7675393],[-2.2448109,51.7674012],[-2.2449225,51.767226],[-2.2449825,51.7671303],[-2.2450598,51.7669922],[-2.2451113,51.7668488],[-2.2451628,51.7666842],[-2.2451971,51.7665779],[-2.2452829,51.7664079],[-2.2453344,51.7662858],[-2.2453688,51.7662114],[-2.2454031,51.7661052],[-2.2454546,51.7660467],[-2.2455233,51.7659618],[-2.2455919,51.7658927],[-2.2456263,51.7658077],[-2.2456778,51.7656909],[-2.2457464,51.7655952],[-2.2458151,51.7655049],[-2.2459095,51.7653774],[-2.2459782,51.7652978],[-2.246064,51.76525],[-2.2461756,51.7651968],[-2.2462099,51.7651597],[-2.2462614,51.7650906],[-2.2463387,51.7650481],[-2.2464159,51.7650003],[-2.2464588,51.7649419],[-2.2465017,51.7648887],[-2.246579,51.7648356],[-2.246682,51.7647719],[-2.2467678,51.7646338],[-2.2468193,51.7645647],[-2.2468622,51.7645169],[-2.2469996,51.7644319],[-2.2471884,51.764331],[-2.2473171,51.7642672],[-2.2474201,51.7642035],[-2.2475231,51.7641344],[-2.247506,51.7640335],[-2.247566,51.7639751],[-2.2477549,51.7639113],[-2.2478493,51.7638635],[-2.2479351,51.763821],[-2.2480209,51.7637732],[-2.2481411,51.7637254],[-2.248287,51.7636776],[-2.2484587,51.7636139],[-2.2488106,51.763497],[-2.2489308,51.7634279],[-2.2490423,51.7633429],[-2.2490767,51.7632951],[-2.2491367,51.7632101],[-2.2491367,51.763157],[-2.249111,51.7630561],[-2.2490767,51.7630189],[-2.2490214,51.7628023],[-2.2490338,51.7629073],[-2.2491797,51.7628595],[-2.2494372,51.7627798],[-2.2496946,51.7627161],[-2.2499693,51.7626364],[-2.2503298,51.7625195],[-2.2506302,51.7624292],[-2.2509821,51.7623336],[-2.2512568,51.762238],[-2.2515486,51.7621583],[-2.251746,51.7621158],[-2.2518833,51.762068],[-2.2518886,51.7620678],[-2.2522524,51.7620521],[-2.2525518,51.7620142],[-2.2526548,51.7619929],[-2.2531021,51.7618449],[-2.253351,51.7617811],[-2.2535227,51.7617599],[-2.2537373,51.7617227],[-2.2537718,51.7617178],[-2.2539261,51.7616961],[-2.2540806,51.7616483],[-2.2543295,51.7616377],[-2.2545784,51.7616005],[-2.2548016,51.7615208],[-2.2550076,51.7614358],[-2.2551878,51.761388],[-2.2553166,51.7613402],[-2.2554539,51.7612765],[-2.2555912,51.7612287],[-2.2557285,51.7611543],[-2.2558745,51.7610746],[-2.2559603,51.7610002],[-2.2560719,51.7609258],[-2.2561319,51.7608727],[-2.2561663,51.7607877],[-2.256192,51.7607133],[-2.2562264,51.7606283],[-2.2562779,51.7605221],[-2.2563294,51.7604424],[-2.2563637,51.7603574],[-2.2563723,51.7602512],[-2.2563379,51.7601555],[-2.2563379,51.7601077],[-2.2563551,51.7600387],[-2.2564066,51.7599271],[-2.2564152,51.759858],[-2.2564066,51.7597358],[-2.2563723,51.7595818],[-2.2563379,51.7594596],[-2.2562864,51.7593055],[-2.2562717,51.7592656],[-2.2562435,51.7591886],[-2.2562349,51.7591196],[-2.2562864,51.7590611],[-2.2563128,51.7590383],[-2.2563723,51.7589868],[-2.2564066,51.7589336],[-2.2564324,51.7588486],[-2.256501,51.7587849],[-2.2565869,51.7586839],[-2.2566212,51.7586414],[-2.2566555,51.758583],[-2.2566813,51.7585033],[-2.2567242,51.7583917],[-2.2567585,51.7582802],[-2.2567928,51.7581686],[-2.2568186,51.7581048],[-2.2568529,51.7580411],[-2.2569044,51.7579348],[-2.2569473,51.7578498],[-2.256913,51.757733],[-2.2569322,51.7576543],[-2.2569987,51.7575609],[-2.2575489,51.756636],[-2.2583126,51.7556148],[-2.2587959,51.755383],[-2.2592246,51.7551167],[-2.259384,51.754878],[-2.259448,51.754734],[-2.259413,51.754363],[-2.2593029,51.754106],[-2.2591709,51.7539939],[-2.2591255,51.7539555],[-2.2590851,51.7539213],[-2.259378,51.7537339],[-2.259799,51.7534049],[-2.259959,51.753165],[-2.2599629,51.7529039],[-2.259973,51.752763],[-2.259784,51.752709],[-2.2597793,51.7526881],[-2.259698,51.752581],[-2.2593729,51.752184],[-2.2588654,51.7516062],[-2.2579611,51.7510659],[-2.2575346,51.7508536],[-2.2578198,51.7507106],[-2.258149,51.7505455],[-2.2586533,51.7504276],[-2.2590075,51.750325],[-2.2592648,51.7502748],[-2.2596137,51.750219],[-2.2599239,51.7501171],[-2.2599152,51.7500906],[-2.2602379,51.749675],[-2.2608699,51.748998],[-2.261311,51.7482259],[-2.2613009,51.7479689],[-2.261568,51.747324],[-2.2615972,51.7468175],[-2.261614,51.746526],[-2.261652,51.7460519],[-2.2618651,51.7458197],[-2.2620879,51.7455769],[-2.2622445,51.745367],[-2.2627317,51.7449392],[-2.2631808,51.7446732],[-2.2632892,51.7446078],[-2.2637045,51.7443574],[-2.2648345,51.7438763],[-2.265584,51.7435004],[-2.2667657,51.7434512],[-2.2669856,51.7434284],[-2.2681212,51.7433107],[-2.2683883,51.7430309],[-2.2687468,51.7428943],[-2.268916,51.742725],[-2.2689414,51.7424885],[-2.2689413,51.7422575],[-2.2690557,51.7409011],[-2.2692172,51.7409146],[-2.2698593,51.7409685],[-2.2711055,51.741088],[-2.2713675,51.7411013],[-2.2716092,51.7411021],[-2.2717254,51.7410864],[-2.2717355,51.7409269],[-2.2716849,51.7407854],[-2.2716625,51.7406407],[-2.2716009,51.7400877],[-2.2716425,51.7399508],[-2.271648,51.7398894],[-2.2716671,51.7398108],[-2.2716798,51.7397401],[-2.2717002,51.7396522],[-2.2717413,51.7396147],[-2.2718104,51.7393154],[-2.2714104,51.7392712],[-2.2714157,51.7392144],[-2.2714265,51.7391577],[-2.2716347,51.7391783],[-2.2716492,51.7391337],[-2.2715714,51.7391223],[-2.2712708,51.7390791],[-2.2714435,51.7389282],[-2.2715122,51.7388219],[-2.2715267,51.7387628],[-2.2718105,51.738486],[-2.2718756,51.7384225],[-2.2720179,51.7382022],[-2.2721231,51.737995],[-2.2723567,51.737705],[-2.2727175,51.7372525],[-2.2728263,51.7371693],[-2.2728743,51.7371179],[-2.2732009,51.736478],[-2.2732426,51.7364038],[-2.2732589,51.7363748],[-2.2733391,51.7362444],[-2.2731295,51.7361238],[-2.2727339,51.7353989],[-2.2727143,51.7353545],[-2.272091,51.733941],[-2.2714194,51.7328426],[-2.2711529,51.732083],[-2.2714959,51.731828],[-2.2715201,51.7317763],[-2.271615,51.7315739],[-2.2707609,51.730776],[-2.2700309,51.730864],[-2.2699412,51.7308501],[-2.2697409,51.730819],[-2.267118,51.729434],[-2.265578,51.7284229],[-2.265303,51.728133],[-2.2651489,51.7278357],[-2.2647224,51.7279256],[-2.264328,51.7279464],[-2.2634729,51.7279799],[-2.2625529,51.7274459],[-2.262324,51.727249],[-2.2622566,51.7269044],[-2.2620148,51.7267964],[-2.2617608,51.7266032],[-2.261655,51.7264997],[-2.2615312,51.7263784],[-2.2614693,51.7263146],[-2.2618252,51.7257242],[-2.2619497,51.7256784],[-2.262096,51.7256189],[-2.262686,51.724691],[-2.263498,51.724349],[-2.2640029,51.724044],[-2.26411,51.7238929],[-2.264021,51.7234629],[-2.264009,51.723286],[-2.2640407,51.723263],[-2.264346,51.723041],[-2.264829,51.7229289],[-2.2658429,51.7227429],[-2.2660339,51.722574],[-2.266195,51.7223239],[-2.266193,51.722019],[-2.266613,51.72068],[-2.266311,51.7199679],[-2.266106,51.7187859],[-2.26615,51.718608],[-2.2671799,51.717975],[-2.2681029,51.717779],[-2.2692509,51.71813],[-2.269703,51.718133],[-2.269903,51.718259],[-2.270523,51.718536],[-2.270901,51.71862],[-2.272124,51.719096],[-2.2723567,51.7193187],[-2.2727318,51.7194254],[-2.2731629,51.719548],[-2.273996,51.7200109],[-2.2743415,51.7201428],[-2.274953,51.720134],[-2.276331,51.719989],[-2.277658,51.7196379],[-2.278568,51.719231],[-2.2792339,51.7186729],[-2.2794592,51.7184413],[-2.279901,51.718108],[-2.2807999,51.717511],[-2.281023,51.717513],[-2.281538,51.7173809],[-2.2816059,51.717288],[-2.282164,51.716941],[-2.283253,51.716681],[-2.2833189,51.716549],[-2.283869,51.716424],[-2.284389,51.716106],[-2.284389,51.71603],[-2.285541,51.7154939],[-2.28647,51.715346],[-2.2875609,51.7153509],[-2.288779,51.7152809],[-2.288991,51.715401],[-2.289769,51.715348],[-2.2904718,51.7151973],[-2.2907109,51.715146],[-2.2914245,51.714955],[-2.291533,51.714926],[-2.292756,51.714148],[-2.2941329,51.71359],[-2.295006,51.7129659],[-2.295463,51.712665],[-2.2957139,51.7126309],[-2.2959005,51.7125278],[-2.295998,51.7124739],[-2.296839,51.7124],[-2.2971229,51.712281],[-2.297274,51.712021],[-2.2981488,51.711681],[-2.298469,51.711518],[-2.298731,51.711293],[-2.299031,51.711161],[-2.299348,51.7108659],[-2.2993659,51.7106513],[-2.2993979,51.710266],[-2.299436,51.7101329],[-2.299664,51.7096989],[-2.2996259,51.709464],[-2.2994885,51.7089357],[-2.2994285,51.7086212],[-2.2996559,51.7079912],[-2.3003252,51.707516],[-2.3003661,51.7074274],[-2.2998082,51.7070019],[-2.2992718,51.7066187],[-2.2991806,51.7064268],[-2.2989322,51.7057798],[-2.2989461,51.7057353],[-2.298907,51.7056456],[-2.2989583,51.7047098],[-2.2989606,51.7046683],[-2.2990493,51.7041461],[-2.299019,51.7040566],[-2.2989812,51.7035745],[-2.2990069,51.7035383],[-2.2989635,51.7031636],[-2.2988556,51.7031044],[-2.2989221,51.7027117],[-2.2990161,51.7021301],[-2.2990638,51.7020673],[-2.2993242,51.7017411],[-2.3002183,51.7011295],[-2.3007658,51.7007685],[-2.3015451,51.7004608],[-2.3022166,51.7003318],[-2.3032278,51.7000425],[-2.3040861,51.6998431],[-2.3043007,51.6998231],[-2.3051268,51.6998497],[-2.3057491,51.6998497],[-2.3063928,51.6997699],[-2.3070933,51.6992596],[-2.3073326,51.6988023],[-2.3076197,51.6979365],[-2.3078054,51.6975764],[-2.3096494,51.6964027],[-2.310109,51.6959159],[-2.3102229,51.6956369],[-2.3103269,51.6939283],[-2.3098812,51.6922686],[-2.3105209,51.6919489],[-2.3112709,51.6915491],[-2.3126584,51.6913209],[-2.3144037,51.6911501],[-2.3151332,51.6912724],[-2.3165047,51.6920325],[-2.3168534,51.6920791],[-2.3172075,51.6920159],[-2.3173165,51.6919655],[-2.3173755,51.6919139],[-2.3174533,51.6918275],[-2.3175124,51.6917603],[-2.3175494,51.6917409],[-2.3175784,51.6917667],[-2.3192254,51.6923534],[-2.319307,51.6923756],[-2.3196285,51.6924969],[-2.3197847,51.6925559],[-2.3226939,51.6935144],[-2.3229353,51.6934529],[-2.3232947,51.6936225],[-2.323479,51.6936184],[-2.3238178,51.6936108],[-2.3237239,51.6939151],[-2.3246231,51.6936057],[-2.325324,51.6933781],[-2.3255489,51.6933467],[-2.326005,51.6933938],[-2.3262299,51.6934547],[-2.32642,51.6934979],[-2.326591,51.6935215],[-2.3268223,51.6936039],[-2.327101,51.6937394],[-2.3273988,51.6939593],[-2.3276648,51.6940543],[-2.3277877,51.6940673],[-2.3279795,51.6940933],[-2.3281278,51.6941221],[-2.3283121,51.6941611],[-2.3283689,51.6941744],[-2.3293373,51.6942099],[-2.3304595,51.6941552],[-2.3309555,51.6941161],[-2.3314136,51.6940197],[-2.3320189,51.693767],[-2.3323207,51.6935518],[-2.3327454,51.6930115],[-2.333457,51.6922933],[-2.3339711,51.6918845],[-2.3345553,51.6914734],[-2.3346083,51.6914361],[-2.3348811,51.6913575],[-2.3347826,51.6910703],[-2.3349704,51.6908874],[-2.3351712,51.6906947],[-2.3351067,51.6906478],[-2.3350215,51.690578],[-2.3349673,51.6904618],[-2.3348898,51.6903533],[-2.3347735,51.6902061],[-2.3347038,51.6900743],[-2.3346108,51.6899969],[-2.3344713,51.6898574],[-2.3342699,51.6896404],[-2.3341149,51.6894699],[-2.3338592,51.6891987],[-2.3336887,51.6889895],[-2.3335802,51.6888577],[-2.3334097,51.688602],[-2.3332769,51.6884309],[-2.3332002,51.6883451],[-2.3330678,51.6882864],[-2.3330152,51.6882729],[-2.3330272,51.6882537],[-2.3331707,51.688188],[-2.3332866,51.688115],[-2.3337584,51.6879899],[-2.3342234,51.6878426],[-2.3344558,51.6877496],[-2.3346573,51.6877031],[-2.3348123,51.6876721],[-2.3348898,51.6876644],[-2.3351765,51.6875327],[-2.3357034,51.6872769],[-2.3358972,51.6871762],[-2.3359746,51.6871762],[-2.3361374,51.687091],[-2.3364473,51.6869902],[-2.3366566,51.6868585],[-2.3367108,51.686812],[-2.3369898,51.6866338],[-2.33723,51.6864943],[-2.3374047,51.6864227],[-2.3376285,51.6863722],[-2.3377368,51.6863216],[-2.3378451,51.6862206],[-2.3383216,51.6857513],[-2.338762,51.6854553],[-2.3393179,51.6850366],[-2.3393868,51.68495],[-2.3394847,51.6844899],[-2.3395337,51.6844841],[-2.3401264,51.6844013],[-2.3409711,51.6842783],[-2.3414661,51.6842099],[-2.3422032,51.6840303],[-2.3427976,51.6838382],[-2.3430211,51.6837753],[-2.3432711,51.6837637],[-2.3436031,51.6837495],[-2.3443386,51.6835551],[-2.3445525,51.6834883],[-2.3445681,51.6834834],[-2.344655,51.6833911],[-2.3451391,51.682877],[-2.3453831,51.6825429],[-2.345772,51.6819539],[-2.3458081,51.6818528],[-2.3457916,51.6818258],[-2.3458437,51.6818016],[-2.3460218,51.6817189],[-2.3462509,51.6816559],[-2.3467902,51.6815903],[-2.3472334,51.6817492],[-2.3478878,51.6819657],[-2.3488423,51.6822569],[-2.3489599,51.6824072],[-2.3490838,51.6825599],[-2.3493045,51.6826613],[-2.350156,51.6826151],[-2.3505717,51.6826912],[-2.3508577,51.6827266],[-2.350889,51.6826299],[-2.3508959,51.6826017],[-2.3508884,51.6825679],[-2.3509196,51.682548],[-2.3510025,51.6824953],[-2.3511203,51.6824278],[-2.3512459,51.6823764],[-2.3518632,51.6822393],[-2.3522744,51.6820503],[-2.3531474,51.6816711],[-2.3532767,51.681615],[-2.3536546,51.6814509],[-2.3537964,51.6813893],[-2.3539867,51.6814815],[-2.3540793,51.6814186],[-2.3541402,51.6814443],[-2.3542536,51.6814196],[-2.3544906,51.6814249],[-2.3546747,51.6814758],[-2.3557315,51.6817677],[-2.3566834,51.6819215],[-2.356781,51.6817608],[-2.3569136,51.6815825],[-2.3570383,51.6814148],[-2.3570608,51.6813807],[-2.3571933,51.6811797],[-2.3572897,51.6810165],[-2.357317,51.6809894],[-2.3574008,51.6809494],[-2.3574902,51.6809002],[-2.3577173,51.6809139],[-2.3578766,51.6809247],[-2.3584058,51.6808998],[-2.3584918,51.6808957],[-2.3587969,51.6808918],[-2.3591949,51.6808157],[-2.3596621,51.6807621],[-2.3601448,51.6807536],[-2.3602101,51.6807373],[-2.3602344,51.6807312],[-2.3633687,51.6806546],[-2.3643513,51.680568],[-2.3655971,51.6803974],[-2.3658652,51.6803833],[-2.3665323,51.6803271],[-2.3668298,51.6803239],[-2.3672,51.68032],[-2.3673894,51.6803394],[-2.3672922,51.680897],[-2.3675185,51.6812524],[-2.3678857,51.6821897],[-2.3683128,51.6831097],[-2.3686741,51.6836929],[-2.3692869,51.6841907],[-2.3694934,51.6843487],[-2.3697553,51.6844663],[-2.3699766,51.6845948],[-2.3700573,51.68462],[-2.3702113,51.6851893],[-2.3702335,51.6853285],[-2.3702142,51.685707],[-2.3700267,51.6860099],[-2.3699469,51.6861594],[-2.3700053,51.6862452],[-2.3701135,51.6862783],[-2.3701541,51.6863408],[-2.3701528,51.6864223],[-2.3701174,51.6865054],[-2.3700836,51.6865563],[-2.3699972,51.6866285],[-2.3698247,51.6867386],[-2.3695641,51.6871014],[-2.3691291,51.6874348],[-2.3688483,51.6877665],[-2.3686603,51.6880976],[-2.3686155,51.6883531],[-2.3686899,51.6883967],[-2.3691281,51.6886535],[-2.3694543,51.6887696],[-2.3698107,51.6889494],[-2.3703122,51.6890842],[-2.3709465,51.6890618],[-2.3713211,51.6892041],[-2.3716322,51.689146],[-2.3719584,51.6888314],[-2.3720581,51.6886666],[-2.3722152,51.6883483],[-2.3722665,51.6880506],[-2.3724659,51.6877865],[-2.3727559,51.687427],[-2.3728646,51.6871929],[-2.3728767,51.6870042],[-2.373252,51.6864344],[-2.3731361,51.6863362],[-2.3735618,51.6862348],[-2.3739146,51.6861036],[-2.3744864,51.6860499],[-2.3750292,51.6859604],[-2.3754335,51.6857706],[-2.3756877,51.6855128],[-2.3758205,51.6854305],[-2.37618,51.6853212],[-2.3762955,51.6853257],[-2.3776943,51.6857609],[-2.3778116,51.6858583],[-2.3778621,51.6861],[-2.3779275,51.686321],[-2.3782748,51.6863438],[-2.3785378,51.6863797],[-2.3788219,51.6864613],[-2.3792323,51.6865852],[-2.3798341,51.6867719],[-2.3799779,51.6867889],[-2.3800944,51.6867422],[-2.380204,51.6866445],[-2.3802661,51.6865211],[-2.3802999,51.6863345],[-2.3803168,51.6862822],[-2.3803522,51.6861384],[-2.3804455,51.6859404],[-2.3805793,51.6857003],[-2.3808038,51.6854454],[-2.3811216,51.6851462],[-2.3815819,51.6847428],[-2.3818506,51.6843907],[-2.3819754,51.6842374],[-2.3821805,51.6840885],[-2.3823022,51.6839981],[-2.3824297,51.683911],[-2.3825487,51.6838457],[-2.382593,51.6838198],[-2.3827283,51.6837495],[-2.3828662,51.6836994],[-2.3830185,51.6836699],[-2.3830472,51.6836417],[-2.3830506,51.6836175],[-2.3830376,51.6835919],[-2.3829744,51.6835674],[-2.3828589,51.6834949],[-2.3826355,51.6832929],[-2.3823981,51.6830418],[-2.3821886,51.6827676],[-2.3819838,51.6824761],[-2.3818628,51.6821846],[-2.3818069,51.6818585],[-2.3817743,51.6815381],[-2.3818116,51.6813072],[-2.381947,51.6807104],[-2.3818548,51.680847],[-2.3817511,51.680984],[-2.3815416,51.6811629],[-2.381374,51.6813736],[-2.3810528,51.6816767],[-2.3806665,51.6818643],[-2.3802522,51.6820115],[-2.3798658,51.6820749],[-2.3797448,51.6820663],[-2.3794173,51.6819872],[-2.3792237,51.6820091],[-2.3788418,51.682049],[-2.3782553,51.6820721],[-2.3780272,51.6820605],[-2.377785,51.6820053],[-2.3776222,51.6819682],[-2.3772853,51.681901],[-2.3772733,51.6819798],[-2.3773243,51.6820576],[-2.3774081,51.6821615],[-2.3775058,51.682225],[-2.377571,51.6823578],[-2.3775663,51.6824877],[-2.37745,51.6826406],[-2.3774007,51.6826747],[-2.3772079,51.682808],[-2.3770078,51.6829639],[-2.3766074,51.6831111],[-2.3757509,51.6833535],[-2.3749643,51.6835613],[-2.3743917,51.6837893],[-2.3742055,51.6838614],[-2.37374,51.6841125],[-2.3733304,51.6842568],[-2.3729999,51.6843203],[-2.3727951,51.6843088],[-2.3725391,51.6841789],[-2.3723808,51.6838326],[-2.3722179,51.6834978],[-2.3720556,51.6831429],[-2.3720632,51.6831044],[-2.3713564,51.6821445],[-2.3710867,51.6816459],[-2.3709663,51.681359],[-2.3708675,51.6809732],[-2.3709118,51.6808538],[-2.3708918,51.680783],[-2.3709199,51.6807067],[-2.3708543,51.680461],[-2.3709247,51.6802975],[-2.3709883,51.6802402],[-2.3711684,51.6797119],[-2.3712721,51.679021],[-2.371062,51.6788455],[-2.3708319,51.6787419],[-2.3708843,51.6786415],[-2.3717995,51.678266],[-2.3719088,51.6781213],[-2.372586,51.6772252],[-2.3734512,51.6761819],[-2.3735308,51.6761383],[-2.3736067,51.6759884],[-2.373712,51.6759199],[-2.3737698,51.6758408],[-2.3738601,51.6757027],[-2.3739065,51.6753931],[-2.3738528,51.6747611],[-2.3736919,51.6741623],[-2.3736168,51.6739627],[-2.3736383,51.6737165],[-2.3736429,51.6735592],[-2.3738206,51.6726956],[-2.3738152,51.6726206],[-2.3737051,51.672594],[-2.3732886,51.6725156],[-2.3733019,51.6724807],[-2.3733546,51.6723504],[-2.3739737,51.6705938],[-2.3741861,51.6700402],[-2.3742117,51.6698597],[-2.3742513,51.6695854],[-2.3742051,51.6693876],[-2.3742557,51.6693739],[-2.3743349,51.6693835],[-2.3745066,51.6693753],[-2.37481,51.6692701],[-2.3751094,51.6692136],[-2.375135,51.6691851],[-2.3754483,51.6692081],[-2.3757241,51.6691731],[-2.3758289,51.6691494],[-2.3758448,51.6691381],[-2.3758994,51.6690992],[-2.3760297,51.6688631],[-2.3761356,51.6687658],[-2.3763172,51.6686818],[-2.3766629,51.668591],[-2.376727,51.6685244],[-2.3767706,51.6683421],[-2.3768644,51.6679432],[-2.3769841,51.6675298],[-2.3771791,51.6672187],[-2.3774459,51.6668963],[-2.3777563,51.6666762],[-2.3785997,51.6661766],[-2.3786177,51.6657983],[-2.3786446,51.6652331],[-2.378931,51.664525],[-2.3791384,51.6634508],[-2.3791565,51.6633731],[-2.3793057,51.66273],[-2.3793491,51.6625505],[-2.3793741,51.6625145],[-2.3793868,51.662491],[-2.3793246,51.6624157],[-2.3792997,51.6623498],[-2.379237,51.6621922],[-2.3792074,51.6621242],[-2.3790491,51.6619968],[-2.3789861,51.6619461],[-2.3787131,51.661658],[-2.3786561,51.6615853],[-2.378478,51.6612966],[-2.3782728,51.6611615],[-2.378117,51.6610905],[-2.3777466,51.6609159],[-2.3770747,51.6606387],[-2.3767099,51.660449],[-2.3766425,51.6601886],[-2.3766284,51.659917],[-2.376653,51.6596632],[-2.3766938,51.6593908],[-2.3763895,51.6593404],[-2.3758463,51.6592843],[-2.3756854,51.6592909],[-2.3754267,51.6592996],[-2.3742922,51.6593398],[-2.3726936,51.6597091],[-2.3714545,51.6601717],[-2.3708322,51.660378],[-2.370741,51.6604179],[-2.3706051,51.6603587],[-2.3706123,51.660221],[-2.3707026,51.6601698],[-2.3708957,51.6601848],[-2.3711023,51.6599402],[-2.3711452,51.6598471],[-2.3711452,51.6596274],[-2.3715958,51.6594477],[-2.3721215,51.6592281],[-2.3724356,51.6590288],[-2.3724876,51.6589735],[-2.3724743,51.6589182],[-2.3714699,51.658724],[-2.3707403,51.6585438],[-2.3700604,51.6583356],[-2.369012,51.657777],[-2.3684343,51.6574658],[-2.3677126,51.6569798],[-2.3675721,51.6567962],[-2.3673437,51.6565954],[-2.3670985,51.6564077],[-2.3668839,51.6561547],[-2.3667766,51.6560483],[-2.3665148,51.6558863],[-2.3665196,51.6558219],[-2.3665234,51.6558076],[-2.3665283,51.6557634],[-2.3667428,51.6554173],[-2.3666999,51.654532],[-2.3669414,51.6530678],[-2.3653724,51.6524293],[-2.3649433,51.6523361],[-2.364568,51.652252],[-2.3641626,51.6522483],[-2.3637524,51.6522902],[-2.3634585,51.6523203],[-2.3630973,51.6523479],[-2.3625131,51.6523936],[-2.3616629,51.6523342],[-2.361172,51.6522365],[-2.3603835,51.6517969],[-2.3593959,51.6510264],[-2.3591756,51.6508546],[-2.3591242,51.6506502],[-2.3590232,51.650292],[-2.3588348,51.6497631],[-2.358514,51.6493805],[-2.3580977,51.6488728],[-2.357769,51.6484241],[-2.3576823,51.6481047],[-2.3576443,51.6474408],[-2.3576209,51.6470418],[-2.3575572,51.6466661],[-2.3573884,51.646132],[-2.3572245,51.6458023],[-2.3570051,51.6454346],[-2.3571269,51.6452742],[-2.3573923,51.644963],[-2.3576499,51.6446633],[-2.3579988,51.6442358],[-2.3582724,51.6438809],[-2.3585496,51.6434851],[-2.3588386,51.6431195],[-2.3590173,51.6428585],[-2.3592592,51.6425795],[-2.3592645,51.6425578],[-2.3592735,51.6424363],[-2.3592766,51.6423378],[-2.3591538,51.6422256],[-2.359003,51.6421196],[-2.3587999,51.6419483],[-2.358753,51.6419021],[-2.3586998,51.6418226],[-2.3586666,51.6417189],[-2.3586698,51.6415059],[-2.3587194,51.6412364],[-2.3587398,51.6411059],[-2.3587384,51.6410201],[-2.3587535,51.6409477],[-2.358757,51.6409309],[-2.3587588,51.6409223],[-2.3588072,51.640861],[-2.3588861,51.6407827],[-2.3589644,51.6407298],[-2.3590691,51.6406857],[-2.359236,51.6406467],[-2.3594113,51.6406189],[-2.3598094,51.6405571],[-2.3601726,51.6404997],[-2.360405,51.6404469],[-2.3605127,51.6404094],[-2.3605283,51.6403993],[-2.3605224,51.6403878],[-2.3604546,51.6403142],[-2.3602942,51.6401847],[-2.3601747,51.6401543],[-2.3600442,51.6400962],[-2.3599699,51.6400631],[-2.3598407,51.6400076],[-2.3596947,51.639957],[-2.3595062,51.639906],[-2.3591449,51.6398366],[-2.3590666,51.6397215],[-2.359002,51.6396249],[-2.3589161,51.6395165],[-2.3588146,51.6394095],[-2.358685,51.6392815],[-2.3585851,51.6392409],[-2.3582214,51.6391515],[-2.3578901,51.6390777],[-2.3572515,51.6389749],[-2.3571039,51.6389488],[-2.3569851,51.638928],[-2.3567498,51.6388796],[-2.356187,51.6387723],[-2.3555031,51.6386043],[-2.3550132,51.6384214],[-2.3549262,51.6383889],[-2.3546575,51.638288],[-2.3546908,51.6382565],[-2.3546378,51.6382395],[-2.3542452,51.6381134],[-2.3538535,51.6380136],[-2.3537557,51.6379905],[-2.3534581,51.6379202],[-2.3530649,51.6378465],[-2.3528052,51.6378123],[-2.3525657,51.6377909],[-2.3522076,51.6377624],[-2.3517604,51.6377191],[-2.3516355,51.6377058],[-2.3510422,51.6376311],[-2.350985,51.6376254],[-2.3506221,51.6375889],[-2.3504027,51.637575],[-2.3503522,51.6375783],[-2.3503065,51.6376072],[-2.3502419,51.6376987],[-2.3501723,51.6378426],[-2.3501453,51.6378985],[-2.3501174,51.6379699],[-2.3500497,51.6381078],[-2.3499841,51.6382003],[-2.3499295,51.638258],[-2.3498421,51.63834],[-2.349672,51.6384985],[-2.3494247,51.638443],[-2.3491592,51.6383304],[-2.3488755,51.6382629],[-2.3485971,51.6382735],[-2.3485661,51.6382804],[-2.3483148,51.6383363],[-2.3480768,51.6383993],[-2.3478677,51.6384831],[-2.347745,51.6385741],[-2.3478554,51.6387405],[-2.347943,51.6387912],[-2.3480238,51.6388327],[-2.3481023,51.638873],[-2.3482495,51.6389505],[-2.3483582,51.6390041],[-2.3485965,51.6391217],[-2.3488059,51.6392349],[-2.3487484,51.6392696],[-2.3485566,51.6394068],[-2.3483929,51.6395231],[-2.3482809,51.6396017],[-2.3482041,51.6396583],[-2.3481168,51.6397163],[-2.3480171,51.6397818],[-2.3479116,51.6398398],[-2.3477635,51.6399094],[-2.3476308,51.6398667],[-2.3475495,51.6398428],[-2.3474806,51.6398303],[-2.3474056,51.6398339],[-2.3473289,51.6398473],[-2.3468,51.640002],[-2.3462042,51.6401811],[-2.3457465,51.6403322],[-2.3456216,51.640383],[-2.3455028,51.6404495],[-2.3454273,51.6404961],[-2.3453338,51.6405646],[-2.3452064,51.6406856],[-2.3450918,51.6407307],[-2.3449493,51.6408204],[-2.3448986,51.6408307],[-2.344838,51.6408314],[-2.3447858,51.640849],[-2.3447419,51.6408699],[-2.3446896,51.6408803],[-2.3446298,51.6408718],[-2.3445777,51.6408539],[-2.3445145,51.640891],[-2.3444464,51.6409376],[-2.3443211,51.6410187],[-2.3439903,51.6411716],[-2.3435751,51.641392],[-2.3433053,51.6414935],[-2.3430716,51.6415626],[-2.3429862,51.6415858],[-2.3428017,51.6416915],[-2.342488,51.6418462],[-2.3423229,51.6419122],[-2.3422362,51.6419727],[-2.3421153,51.6419242],[-2.3420698,51.6419062],[-2.3420154,51.6418689],[-2.3419538,51.6418925],[-2.341908,51.6419214],[-2.3418757,51.6419503],[-2.3418122,51.6419768],[-2.3416789,51.6420038],[-2.3414947,51.6420122],[-2.3413699,51.6420119],[-2.3411826,51.6420114],[-2.3410921,51.6420128],[-2.3406422,51.642005],[-2.3396257,51.6421398],[-2.3392395,51.6422996],[-2.3385314,51.642506],[-2.3378554,51.6426791],[-2.3375266,51.6427966],[-2.3375014,51.6428056],[-2.3373726,51.6426459],[-2.3372654,51.6424261],[-2.3371795,51.642253],[-2.3371053,51.6420248],[-2.337102,51.6420013],[-2.3370884,51.6419062],[-2.3370942,51.6417881],[-2.3371371,51.6417136],[-2.3369122,51.6416126],[-2.3365358,51.6411278],[-2.3362139,51.6408482],[-2.335656,51.6408082],[-2.3354307,51.6406551],[-2.3351609,51.640489],[-2.3352107,51.6404208],[-2.334551,51.6403921],[-2.3336766,51.6403721],[-2.3331938,51.6403089],[-2.3326037,51.6401557],[-2.3318097,51.6399759],[-2.3314099,51.6398421],[-2.3310641,51.6397263],[-2.3303989,51.6395465],[-2.3294172,51.6394433],[-2.3284302,51.6393101],[-2.327427,51.6392469],[-2.3262951,51.6391703],[-2.325528,51.639157],[-2.3249003,51.6391091],[-2.3243049,51.6390571],[-2.3238168,51.6389905],[-2.3234949,51.6389639],[-2.3231408,51.6389639],[-2.3227785,51.6389938],[-2.322669,51.6389352],[-2.3226419,51.6388748],[-2.3226529,51.6388603],[-2.3227012,51.6388278],[-2.322783,51.638797],[-2.3230591,51.6387441],[-2.323192,51.638723],[-2.3233101,51.6387138],[-2.3234748,51.6387092],[-2.3241011,51.6386043],[-2.3253572,51.6383749],[-2.3261136,51.6382815],[-2.3261141,51.6382814],[-2.3268691,51.6382314],[-2.3275665,51.6381881],[-2.3281749,51.6381364],[-2.3285508,51.6380754],[-2.3289257,51.6379951],[-2.3294101,51.6378364],[-2.3298044,51.637676],[-2.3308978,51.6371543],[-2.3313994,51.6368332],[-2.331562,51.6367187],[-2.3317802,51.6365667],[-2.3318365,51.6364419],[-2.3318488,51.6363038],[-2.3319969,51.6361365],[-2.3321549,51.6359025],[-2.3314783,51.6358929],[-2.3307629,51.6358488],[-2.3303828,51.6357777],[-2.3300609,51.6356711],[-2.3296764,51.6354955],[-2.3291222,51.635185],[-2.3285589,51.6347688],[-2.3283443,51.6344825],[-2.3280439,51.634073],[-2.3279766,51.6338568],[-2.3278884,51.6334936],[-2.3274013,51.6333588],[-2.3273985,51.6332774],[-2.3274538,51.6329242],[-2.3276043,51.6324848],[-2.3277266,51.631972],[-2.3278389,51.631689],[-2.328166,51.6311586],[-2.3284731,51.6305002],[-2.3287788,51.630034],[-2.32912,51.6296659],[-2.3294279,51.6293846],[-2.3295299,51.6292248],[-2.3296586,51.6289151],[-2.3298961,51.6286227],[-2.3304418,51.6280959],[-2.3307422,51.6278528],[-2.3310456,51.6277626],[-2.3316327,51.6276164],[-2.3319089,51.6274658],[-2.3322067,51.6273433],[-2.3324588,51.6271635],[-2.332829,51.6268438],[-2.3334215,51.6264861],[-2.3339072,51.6262011],[-2.334272,51.625918],[-2.334492,51.6256183],[-2.3347763,51.6251488],[-2.3349694,51.624889],[-2.3350981,51.6247025],[-2.335184,51.6244561],[-2.3352612,51.6242838],[-2.3353679,51.6241499],[-2.335483,51.6240583],[-2.3357085,51.6240048],[-2.3361669,51.6239887],[-2.3367122,51.6239381],[-2.3370612,51.6238586],[-2.337272,51.623785],[-2.3373817,51.6237084],[-2.3374488,51.6236383],[-2.3374585,51.6234703],[-2.3374821,51.623131],[-2.3375389,51.6227642],[-2.337542,51.6227167],[-2.3375415,51.6226606],[-2.3374638,51.6225777],[-2.3372439,51.6224745],[-2.3368173,51.6223305],[-2.3340046,51.6212854],[-2.3327753,51.6208725],[-2.3319258,51.6205591],[-2.3318498,51.6205604],[-2.3317701,51.6205682],[-2.3315381,51.6205974],[-2.3312826,51.6205876],[-2.3310785,51.6205601],[-2.3309703,51.6204265],[-2.3309298,51.6202779],[-2.3309783,51.6201431],[-2.3311607,51.6198467],[-2.3315791,51.6191839],[-2.3323516,51.6181713],[-2.3328129,51.6174053],[-2.3327944,51.6171488],[-2.3329617,51.6170411],[-2.3331235,51.6168623],[-2.3336444,51.616466],[-2.3339678,51.616251],[-2.3341869,51.6161319],[-2.3345597,51.6160496],[-2.3347135,51.6159639],[-2.334793,51.6158229],[-2.3348312,51.6156463],[-2.3347978,51.615592],[-2.3347873,51.6155166],[-2.3347417,51.6155021],[-2.3346647,51.6154658],[-2.3345859,51.6154079],[-2.3344125,51.6152831],[-2.3342759,51.6151996],[-2.3341008,51.6151171],[-2.3340576,51.6151011],[-2.3339245,51.6150519],[-2.3336057,51.6149163],[-2.3333024,51.6148034],[-2.3331339,51.614734],[-2.332276,51.614414],[-2.3319024,51.6142914],[-2.3317181,51.6142299],[-2.3314085,51.6140862],[-2.3310909,51.6139044],[-2.3307959,51.6136579],[-2.330629,51.613413],[-2.3303139,51.6131709],[-2.329558,51.6127979],[-2.3291529,51.612663],[-2.328079,51.612379],[-2.3271309,51.6121969],[-2.3267189,51.6120809],[-2.3263759,51.611816],[-2.3261309,51.611559],[-2.325768,51.611323],[-2.3244029,51.610678],[-2.324184,51.6106429],[-2.3236666,51.61045],[-2.3232267,51.61036],[-2.3230014,51.6102801],[-2.322941,51.6102311],[-2.322799,51.610116],[-2.3224039,51.609816],[-2.321303,51.609214],[-2.3209409,51.6088739],[-2.3195589,51.6080689],[-2.3185137,51.6075006],[-2.3184629,51.607473],[-2.3188989,51.6073039],[-2.319374,51.6071059],[-2.3198326,51.6068477],[-2.3201322,51.6066105],[-2.3202325,51.6063829],[-2.3203253,51.6061724],[-2.3196428,51.6061724],[-2.3186414,51.6060261],[-2.3174339,51.6056053],[-2.3149599,51.6044895],[-2.31334,51.6034834],[-2.3123113,51.6025823],[-2.3121914,51.6024773],[-2.3117159,51.6021502],[-2.311681,51.6021027],[-2.3116166,51.6020153],[-2.3112384,51.6018154],[-2.3101334,51.6014055],[-2.3097015,51.601104],[-2.3095513,51.6007458],[-2.3091651,51.6004842],[-2.3090256,51.600276],[-2.3080548,51.5996019],[-2.308663,51.5992679],[-2.310026,51.5988718],[-2.3110721,51.5986416],[-2.3114845,51.5983332],[-2.3117457,51.5979966],[-2.312434,51.597303],[-2.312746,51.5971079],[-2.313626,51.596283],[-2.314199,51.595884],[-2.314909,51.5954979],[-2.315441,51.595116],[-2.315598,51.594929],[-2.316559,51.594571],[-2.3174244,51.5942463],[-2.3181786,51.5940199],[-2.3193559,51.593936],[-2.320073,51.593894],[-2.319901,51.5933979],[-2.3197826,51.5932128],[-2.319709,51.5930979],[-2.319403,51.5927697],[-2.3202479,51.5925929],[-2.321021,51.5923509],[-2.321899,51.5920189],[-2.323088,51.5916129],[-2.3240439,51.5911849],[-2.3247229,51.590829],[-2.3254689,51.5902759],[-2.3265924,51.5894262],[-2.3273447,51.5887896],[-2.3276559,51.5885563],[-2.3279496,51.5883796],[-2.3282003,51.5881822],[-2.329011,51.587596],[-2.3292451,51.5874139],[-2.3294447,51.5872355],[-2.3293448,51.5871974],[-2.3294639,51.5870865],[-2.3295859,51.5869628],[-2.3295412,51.5869122],[-2.3291753,51.586791],[-2.3287159,51.5866319],[-2.3283215,51.5864475],[-2.3277158,51.5861039],[-2.3272198,51.5858311],[-2.3270328,51.5857149],[-2.3270022,51.5856616],[-2.3270438,51.5855941],[-2.3265524,51.585212],[-2.3263834,51.5850058],[-2.326139,51.5846975],[-2.3263471,51.5845253],[-2.326677,51.584282],[-2.3270204,51.5840665],[-2.3272515,51.5839621],[-2.327638,51.5833459],[-2.3277289,51.582653],[-2.3278849,51.582084],[-2.3278896,51.5817867],[-2.3278147,51.5815035],[-2.3278088,51.581477],[-2.3277582,51.5812317],[-2.32783,51.5808889],[-2.3279995,51.5804349],[-2.3282302,51.5799682],[-2.3287561,51.5790912],[-2.3288766,51.5788748],[-2.3290483,51.5784815],[-2.3291779,51.577676],[-2.329061,51.5769526],[-2.3289629,51.5763459],[-2.328731,51.575799],[-2.327738,51.574753],[-2.3267179,51.573806],[-2.3265359,51.573559],[-2.326441,51.573188],[-2.326351,51.572019],[-2.3263909,51.571493],[-2.3266908,51.5704793],[-2.3281359,51.5696145],[-2.3286294,51.5691744],[-2.3290137,51.568541],[-2.3292302,51.5682008],[-2.3294877,51.5675206],[-2.3296594,51.566907],[-2.3298525,51.5659867],[-2.329903,51.5649939],[-2.331118,51.564068],[-2.331541,51.5636589],[-2.33225,51.5633989],[-2.332739,51.563119],[-2.33373,51.5627239],[-2.335084,51.562491],[-2.335604,51.5622629],[-2.335978,51.561951],[-2.3360559,51.5615045],[-2.336148,51.5614189],[-2.336711,51.561504],[-2.339999,51.5612129],[-2.340159,51.561251],[-2.340394,51.5613739],[-2.340581,51.561308],[-2.340703,51.561303],[-2.340824,51.561349],[-2.340911,51.561351],[-2.3406829,51.561168],[-2.340868,51.561121],[-2.340868,51.561038],[-2.342004,51.5597309],[-2.342119,51.5594589],[-2.3421263,51.5591703],[-2.341988,51.558774],[-2.3416759,51.558506],[-2.340314,51.557184],[-2.341559,51.5566259],[-2.342113,51.556506],[-2.342561,51.5565229],[-2.3429129,51.556759],[-2.343134,51.5569439],[-2.343333,51.5571309],[-2.3435779,51.557263],[-2.3440412,51.5571386],[-2.3442222,51.5570176],[-2.3443251,51.5569187],[-2.3444315,51.5567562],[-2.3452526,51.5568272],[-2.3454159,51.5568413],[-2.3454151,51.5566035],[-2.3453294,51.5563783],[-2.3453185,51.5562638],[-2.3453497,51.5561469],[-2.345868,51.554752],[-2.346717,51.553062],[-2.346961,51.55263],[-2.347091,51.552095],[-2.34728,51.551757],[-2.347305,51.551484],[-2.34752,51.551201],[-2.348337,51.55065],[-2.348799,51.550244],[-2.349198,51.549688],[-2.349346,51.549282],[-2.349557,51.549039],[-2.349735,51.548684],[-2.350071,51.548325],[-2.350214,51.548105],[-2.3502549,51.5480537],[-2.3510804,51.54796],[-2.3512486,51.5479692],[-2.3514978,51.5477786],[-2.3513843,51.5475581],[-2.3513199,51.547398],[-2.3512663,51.5472512],[-2.3512234,51.5470977],[-2.3512341,51.5469109],[-2.3513092,51.5465973],[-2.3513521,51.5463505],[-2.3514057,51.5461036],[-2.3514379,51.5459501],[-2.3514165,51.5457366],[-2.3513736,51.5456099],[-2.351299,51.5454617],[-2.3512341,51.5453697],[-2.3510624,51.5452562],[-2.35088,51.5451562],[-2.3507513,51.5450627],[-2.3506225,51.5449093],[-2.3504401,51.5446824],[-2.3502685,51.5444622],[-2.3500861,51.5442487],[-2.349893,51.5440419],[-2.3496784,51.5438284],[-2.3495282,51.5436682],[-2.3494316,51.5435414],[-2.3493673,51.5434547],[-2.3493673,51.5433546],[-2.3494209,51.5432545],[-2.3494644,51.5431908],[-2.3494097,51.5431705],[-2.34929,51.543126],[-2.34909,51.543122],[-2.3487166,51.5430438],[-2.348684,51.543037],[-2.348244,51.543283],[-2.3477579,51.543489],[-2.3469809,51.543849],[-2.346989,51.5436829],[-2.3471052,51.5435356],[-2.347151,51.543428],[-2.3470979,51.543319],[-2.3471165,51.5432186],[-2.3467559,51.5432008],[-2.3467385,51.5429707],[-2.34717,51.5407],[-2.347214,51.540008],[-2.347367,51.53923],[-2.347428,51.539152],[-2.347801,51.539153],[-2.349231,51.539795],[-2.349553,51.540017],[-2.349592,51.539584],[-2.350105,51.538641],[-2.35035,51.538342],[-2.350485,51.538034],[-2.350443,51.537632],[-2.350514,51.53689],[-2.3507,51.536475],[-2.351586,51.535651],[-2.351842,51.535063],[-2.351847,51.534939],[-2.352015,51.534643],[-2.352169,51.534535],[-2.352441,51.534431],[-2.3526399,51.5342985],[-2.3526969,51.5342099],[-2.3528383,51.5342765],[-2.3529794,51.534298],[-2.353012,51.534303],[-2.3534681,51.5343313],[-2.3535092,51.5344173],[-2.3535961,51.5344465],[-2.3540358,51.5345029],[-2.3540976,51.5345033],[-2.3555129,51.5343909],[-2.3555829,51.5343359],[-2.3559831,51.5343141],[-2.3560597,51.5342387],[-2.3560879,51.534211],[-2.3569089,51.5333839],[-2.356939,51.5332449],[-2.3570542,51.533135],[-2.3570639,51.5327032],[-2.3570654,51.5323202],[-2.3571917,51.5322054],[-2.3573236,51.5322319],[-2.3573897,51.5318382],[-2.357578,51.5315171],[-2.3577089,51.531221],[-2.3577563,51.5311189],[-2.3578722,51.530869],[-2.3582145,51.5304329],[-2.3585023,51.530105],[-2.3586338,51.5299292],[-2.3587423,51.5297766],[-2.3587823,51.5297015],[-2.3588134,51.529501],[-2.3588434,51.5293618],[-2.3589405,51.5290223],[-2.3588197,51.5289724],[-2.3581144,51.5286691],[-2.3574794,51.5284738],[-2.3562963,51.5277872],[-2.3560413,51.5275141],[-2.3560445,51.5274662],[-2.3561404,51.5269197],[-2.3556303,51.5259895],[-2.3554866,51.5252691],[-2.3552828,51.5249441],[-2.3550645,51.524831],[-2.3551558,51.5247482],[-2.355406,51.52444],[-2.3556386,51.524126],[-2.35583,51.5238116],[-2.3561081,51.5235049],[-2.3563697,51.5233077],[-2.3566866,51.5231038],[-2.356535,51.522968],[-2.356138,51.5227159],[-2.355314,51.522344],[-2.3544759,51.5219409],[-2.3544851,51.5215315],[-2.3538694,51.5212513],[-2.3536476,51.5211451],[-2.3536058,51.5211251],[-2.3537159,51.520953],[-2.352874,51.5196209],[-2.3525659,51.519013],[-2.3523629,51.518406],[-2.352264,51.5182299],[-2.352299,51.5181009],[-2.352078,51.51762],[-2.3518159,51.516738],[-2.351596,51.516469],[-2.351453,51.516391],[-2.350144,51.514566],[-2.3499149,51.5143329],[-2.349579,51.513981],[-2.349161,51.5135109],[-2.348714,51.513214],[-2.348431,51.5130929],[-2.348281,51.512974],[-2.3475859,51.512583],[-2.3471289,51.512268],[-2.346584,51.511805],[-2.3461509,51.511371],[-2.345626,51.51097],[-2.345549,51.5108529],[-2.345121,51.510458],[-2.344816,51.510336],[-2.344606,51.510255],[-2.3437029,51.509703],[-2.343438,51.509564],[-2.3432589,51.509566],[-2.3431049,51.5095008],[-2.3402939,51.5084318],[-2.3392282,51.5080252],[-2.339193,51.507988],[-2.339157,51.5079543],[-2.3391073,51.5079432],[-2.337411,51.5075977],[-2.3367876,51.5075536],[-2.3366046,51.5075445],[-2.3364332,51.5075359],[-2.3363218,51.507548],[-2.336308,51.5076213],[-2.3362374,51.5078033],[-2.3362521,51.5078846],[-2.3363015,51.5079423],[-2.3363729,51.5079921],[-2.3363325,51.5080268],[-2.335214,51.508254],[-2.3343948,51.5081331],[-2.3343033,51.5081033],[-2.3342398,51.5080827],[-2.3342644,51.5080098],[-2.334341,51.5078506],[-2.3344683,51.5076403],[-2.334683,51.5073536],[-2.3347062,51.507325],[-2.3348765,51.5071149],[-2.3349037,51.5070463],[-2.3348627,51.5069887],[-2.3347744,51.5069542],[-2.3340875,51.5068366],[-2.3335276,51.5067276],[-2.333,51.5065866],[-2.3326413,51.5064833],[-2.3325124,51.5064209],[-2.332405,51.5063689],[-2.3322598,51.5062781],[-2.3322065,51.5062228],[-2.3321833,51.5061278],[-2.3322605,51.5053144],[-2.3322544,51.5049258],[-2.3322259,51.5046579],[-2.3322103,51.5044682],[-2.3321795,51.5041796],[-2.3321164,51.5038604],[-2.3319881,51.5034942],[-2.3318695,51.5032561],[-2.3315608,51.5027447],[-2.3312574,51.5021992],[-2.3310913,51.5018603],[-2.3309537,51.501641],[-2.3307743,51.5013817],[-2.3303789,51.5009483],[-2.3305718,51.500865],[-2.3306644,51.5008445],[-2.3307607,51.5008429],[-2.3319809,51.5008677],[-2.3335363,51.5009101],[-2.3337023,51.5009146],[-2.3354181,51.5009526],[-2.335527,51.5009297],[-2.3355895,51.5008792],[-2.3355938,51.5008078],[-2.335566,51.5007651],[-2.3357802,51.5004126],[-2.3360404,51.5001336],[-2.3374134,51.4991179],[-2.3378898,51.4988076],[-2.3385011,51.4985035],[-2.3396484,51.4979644],[-2.341827,51.4968578],[-2.3436984,51.4961086],[-2.3463911,51.4950397],[-2.3476108,51.4945869],[-2.3488299,51.4958673],[-2.3492212,51.4961921],[-2.3494197,51.4963358],[-2.3497631,51.4964532],[-2.3502591,51.4966114],[-2.3505213,51.4966874],[-2.3507403,51.4967408],[-2.3510931,51.4967951],[-2.3514811,51.4968374],[-2.3517545,51.4968672],[-2.3526605,51.4969738],[-2.3531757,51.4970374],[-2.3533514,51.4970669],[-2.3533782,51.4970552],[-2.3536632,51.4967254],[-2.3537581,51.4967597],[-2.35392,51.4968131],[-2.3539072,51.496856],[-2.3539035,51.4970541],[-2.3539184,51.4971259],[-2.3539383,51.4972828],[-2.3539601,51.4976082],[-2.3539312,51.4980534],[-2.353932,51.4981133],[-2.3546932,51.4982203],[-2.3547178,51.4981728],[-2.3547614,51.4980524],[-2.3548268,51.4979775],[-2.3549267,51.4979109],[-2.3550765,51.497846],[-2.3553308,51.4978219],[-2.355651,51.497861],[-2.3571833,51.4980447],[-2.357733,51.498188],[-2.357908,51.498286],[-2.358075,51.4983136],[-2.3582831,51.4982811],[-2.3585318,51.4982565],[-2.3593929,51.498333],[-2.3603653,51.4983699],[-2.3607503,51.4983417],[-2.3608312,51.4983151],[-2.3609108,51.4982605],[-2.3610031,51.4982392],[-2.3622673,51.4981708],[-2.3624067,51.4981674],[-2.3625498,51.4981811],[-2.3627769,51.4982271],[-2.3629922,51.4982971],[-2.3648139,51.496004],[-2.3662703,51.490523],[-2.3662575,51.4904399],[-2.3660107,51.4904565],[-2.365794,51.4885974],[-2.3655666,51.4872311],[-2.3656319,51.4872261],[-2.3657444,51.4872215],[-2.3661466,51.4872071],[-2.3662285,51.4872008],[-2.3663123,51.4871772],[-2.3663906,51.4871273],[-2.366891,51.486856],[-2.367756,51.4865629],[-2.3702529,51.486265],[-2.370709,51.4861989],[-2.373333,51.4854839],[-2.3740209,51.4852229],[-2.3744209,51.484924],[-2.3753279,51.4843609],[-2.376143,51.4839876],[-2.3766708,51.483687],[-2.3776442,51.4828564],[-2.3777328,51.482757],[-2.3777446,51.4827283],[-2.3777727,51.4825228],[-2.377763,51.482441],[-2.377725,51.4821617],[-2.3776748,51.4818808],[-2.377326,51.4812125],[-2.3771368,51.4811514],[-2.3769049,51.4811027],[-2.3766652,51.4810326],[-2.3763497,51.480973],[-2.3760355,51.4808328],[-2.3759726,51.4807597],[-2.3759503,51.4806731],[-2.375962,51.4804884],[-2.3759439,51.4803802],[-2.3759178,51.4801534],[-2.3758254,51.4799838],[-2.375809,51.4798962],[-2.375813,51.4797913],[-2.3759149,51.4792242],[-2.3759155,51.4791843],[-2.3759669,51.4791361],[-2.3761667,51.4790288],[-2.3762662,51.478778],[-2.3761566,51.4785987],[-2.3760703,51.4785395],[-2.3758285,51.4784519],[-2.3756896,51.4783641],[-2.3756038,51.4782037],[-2.3754857,51.4780296],[-2.375698,51.477613],[-2.3759449,51.4772839],[-2.3762629,51.476886],[-2.3768679,51.476331],[-2.377279,51.4761059],[-2.377734,51.4757609],[-2.378153,51.475311],[-2.378141,51.475095],[-2.3783199,51.4748689],[-2.378343,51.4748291],[-2.378891,51.473885],[-2.379035,51.4737629],[-2.3791109,51.473494],[-2.378991,51.4720929],[-2.379074,51.471989],[-2.3790389,51.471566],[-2.3791559,51.471041],[-2.379131,51.470674],[-2.3789509,51.469984],[-2.3786629,51.469211],[-2.3785789,51.4683129],[-2.378641,51.468098],[-2.3787079,51.467768],[-2.378804,51.467344],[-2.379161,51.4667739],[-2.3791129,51.466004],[-2.3787789,51.465659],[-2.3785287,51.4653216],[-2.378401,51.4647749],[-2.378274,51.4643979],[-2.3782789,51.4640239],[-2.378143,51.4639979],[-2.3780796,51.4639417],[-2.377823,51.463714],[-2.3776487,51.4634835],[-2.3774276,51.4632396],[-2.3770927,51.4629832],[-2.3752481,51.4616924],[-2.3751889,51.461651],[-2.3751434,51.4616017],[-2.3750832,51.461581],[-2.3741441,51.4622155],[-2.3740955,51.4622339],[-2.3715538,51.460175],[-2.3714151,51.4600619],[-2.370903,51.459287],[-2.3705026,51.4586988],[-2.3702156,51.4583346],[-2.3701958,51.4583129],[-2.3698769,51.4579643],[-2.3696417,51.4577639],[-2.369549,51.4577589],[-2.3694629,51.4577437],[-2.3693852,51.4577265],[-2.3669029,51.4557279],[-2.366501,51.455293],[-2.366316,51.455114],[-2.362766,51.454819],[-2.3626412,51.4547593],[-2.361697,51.4549912],[-2.3612137,51.4551112],[-2.3611785,51.45505],[-2.360169,51.4532895],[-2.3600891,51.4532685],[-2.3596789,51.4527561],[-2.3594112,51.452288],[-2.3600141,51.4521517],[-2.3614069,51.4518],[-2.3620621,51.4515912],[-2.3621629,51.4515662],[-2.3622034,51.4515561],[-2.3624513,51.4515289],[-2.3627471,51.4515282],[-2.3628497,51.4515533],[-2.3631603,51.4516431],[-2.3634175,51.4516797],[-2.3636961,51.4516861],[-2.3639258,51.4516644],[-2.3639555,51.4516624],[-2.3640773,51.451644],[-2.3646334,51.4515599],[-2.3649345,51.4514966],[-2.3652645,51.4514423],[-2.36603,51.451354],[-2.3662817,51.4513124],[-2.3662978,51.451282],[-2.3663393,51.4512528],[-2.3664723,51.4512266],[-2.3677206,51.4509805],[-2.3678253,51.4509556],[-2.3678852,51.4509414],[-2.367938,51.4509274],[-2.3681018,51.4509024],[-2.3684684,51.4507868],[-2.3690311,51.4506484],[-2.3700248,51.4504781],[-2.3713311,51.4502892],[-2.371924,51.4502343],[-2.372404,51.4501964],[-2.3725265,51.4501788],[-2.3726356,51.4501515],[-2.3727412,51.4501216],[-2.3728331,51.4500821],[-2.3729189,51.4500197],[-2.3731406,51.4497912],[-2.3732659,51.4496983],[-2.3734059,51.4496356],[-2.3737901,51.4494924],[-2.3744738,51.4492014],[-2.3750851,51.4489219],[-2.3760636,51.448421],[-2.3761942,51.4483351],[-2.3763156,51.4482223],[-2.3763683,51.4481362],[-2.3765222,51.4478196],[-2.3766441,51.4476084],[-2.3767191,51.4474966],[-2.3767994,51.4474221],[-2.3772174,51.447167],[-2.3777659,51.4467492],[-2.3782043,51.4463405],[-2.3782424,51.4462928],[-2.3782379,51.446235],[-2.3782288,51.4461971],[-2.3781892,51.4460314],[-2.3781707,51.4458351],[-2.3782221,51.4455224],[-2.3783391,51.4450781],[-2.3784493,51.4448965],[-2.3784774,51.4446857],[-2.3785009,51.4444612],[-2.378565,51.4442997],[-2.3787247,51.4438763],[-2.3787438,51.4438294],[-2.3787861,51.4437901],[-2.3788492,51.4437562],[-2.3790857,51.4436476],[-2.3791325,51.4436145],[-2.3791696,51.4435761],[-2.379344,51.443238],[-2.379564,51.4430266],[-2.3797008,51.4428965],[-2.3798523,51.4427996],[-2.3799215,51.4427575],[-2.3799906,51.4427079],[-2.3801537,51.4425796],[-2.380599,51.441645],[-2.381321,51.4404717],[-2.3817073,51.4393856],[-2.3819889,51.438853],[-2.382099,51.4387371],[-2.3824879,51.4383279],[-2.382898,51.437913],[-2.3833388,51.4374091],[-2.383755,51.4372054],[-2.3835797,51.4370017],[-2.3835428,51.4369174],[-2.3835444,51.4368405],[-2.3835065,51.4367126],[-2.3834458,51.4366005],[-2.3833859,51.4364658],[-2.3833044,51.4361863],[-2.383297,51.4361485],[-2.3832906,51.4361237],[-2.3845739,51.4351359],[-2.3858686,51.4338655],[-2.386566,51.4334659],[-2.3886917,51.431919],[-2.3898238,51.4312912],[-2.3898572,51.4312592],[-2.3898923,51.4312247],[-2.3899867,51.4312319],[-2.3903632,51.4312186],[-2.3905698,51.431186],[-2.3907839,51.4311367],[-2.3910239,51.4310603],[-2.3911788,51.4309828],[-2.3913362,51.4308718],[-2.3915867,51.4306328],[-2.391746,51.4305072],[-2.3921485,51.4302194],[-2.3923088,51.4301284],[-2.392528,51.430035],[-2.3930139,51.4298904],[-2.3932262,51.4298504],[-2.3945644,51.4297656],[-2.3950098,51.4297266],[-2.3953862,51.4297074],[-2.3955127,51.4296784],[-2.3956621,51.4296357],[-2.3958725,51.4296361],[-2.3963013,51.4296937],[-2.3965218,51.4297802],[-2.3966244,51.4298148],[-2.3967361,51.429828],[-2.3968886,51.4298306],[-2.3969901,51.4298246],[-2.3971108,51.429848],[-2.3971663,51.4298723],[-2.39791,51.431128],[-2.3979496,51.4314087],[-2.3979812,51.4314819],[-2.3980444,51.4315551],[-2.3982125,51.4316677],[-2.3983489,51.4317902],[-2.3984735,51.4318738],[-2.3986515,51.4319147],[-2.398883,51.4320122],[-2.399014,51.4320535],[-2.3991064,51.4320549],[-2.399281,51.43204],[-2.3994901,51.4319867],[-2.3997712,51.4319171],[-2.4001102,51.4318785],[-2.4006322,51.431809],[-2.4009921,51.4317462],[-2.4010745,51.431688],[-2.4012056,51.4315479],[-2.4012434,51.4314549],[-2.4014722,51.4312787],[-2.4015837,51.4311641],[-2.4017781,51.4309682],[-2.4020673,51.4307282],[-2.4025821,51.4302471],[-2.4026664,51.4301437],[-2.4027329,51.4299733],[-2.4029153,51.4299555],[-2.4030555,51.4299634],[-2.4031404,51.4299908],[-2.4032186,51.4300344],[-2.4032881,51.4300706],[-2.4030655,51.4307652],[-2.4030624,51.430799],[-2.4030748,51.4308585],[-2.4031231,51.4308965],[-2.4032031,51.4309225],[-2.4032789,51.4309282],[-2.4033761,51.4309237],[-2.4034014,51.4309805],[-2.4034628,51.4309985],[-2.4036062,51.4309806],[-2.4038608,51.4309476],[-2.406253,51.430869],[-2.4077212,51.4309618],[-2.4078129,51.4309629],[-2.407885,51.4309368],[-2.4079317,51.4309249],[-2.4079948,51.430955],[-2.4081034,51.4309784],[-2.4082523,51.4309876],[-2.4086418,51.4309941],[-2.4089981,51.4308777],[-2.4095586,51.4307236],[-2.4099185,51.4306562],[-2.4103268,51.4306485],[-2.4107081,51.4305689],[-2.4110717,51.4304604],[-2.411374,51.4303279],[-2.412458,51.4300709],[-2.4133979,51.4299829],[-2.414291,51.4298989],[-2.4149459,51.4297848],[-2.4149269,51.4297635],[-2.412481,51.428641],[-2.4118122,51.4282393],[-2.4117747,51.428162],[-2.4117305,51.4280975],[-2.4114002,51.4278314],[-2.411339,51.4277702],[-2.4113159,51.4277205],[-2.4112836,51.4276416],[-2.4110286,51.4272644],[-2.4110116,51.4272482],[-2.4108878,51.4272169],[-2.410854,51.4271798],[-2.410671,51.4271565],[-2.4103268,51.4270815],[-2.4097903,51.4269478],[-2.4094738,51.4268127],[-2.4094471,51.4267948],[-2.407284,51.4249513],[-2.4054177,51.423469],[-2.4053946,51.4234437],[-2.4053923,51.4234181],[-2.4054087,51.4233972],[-2.405443,51.4233853],[-2.4060574,51.4233234],[-2.4080804,51.4229689],[-2.4082258,51.4227869],[-2.4085846,51.4223596],[-2.4088525,51.422106],[-2.408917,51.4220449],[-2.4092012,51.4218338],[-2.4093789,51.4217287],[-2.4096005,51.4216371],[-2.4101278,51.4214649],[-2.4103811,51.4213992],[-2.4107492,51.421324],[-2.4117903,51.4211498],[-2.4129448,51.4210159],[-2.4135582,51.4209809],[-2.414249,51.4210048],[-2.4146248,51.4209941],[-2.4149877,51.4209604],[-2.4154211,51.4208829],[-2.41549,51.4208706],[-2.4160203,51.4207794],[-2.4166716,51.4206781],[-2.4168899,51.4206659],[-2.4173023,51.4207012],[-2.4175414,51.4207049],[-2.4178124,51.4206829],[-2.4188261,51.4205343],[-2.419052,51.4201932],[-2.4192769,51.4200659],[-2.4193401,51.4200063],[-2.4209692,51.4193481],[-2.42162,51.4190722],[-2.4223141,51.4186507],[-2.4226629,51.4183592],[-2.4220758,51.4183717],[-2.4218773,51.4183454],[-2.421779,51.4183066],[-2.4217565,51.4183195],[-2.4217322,51.4183232],[-2.421579,51.4183056],[-2.4179882,51.4182599],[-2.4178509,51.418201],[-2.4179282,51.4178049],[-2.4182629,51.4172911],[-2.4188723,51.4168254],[-2.418795,51.416638],[-2.4180741,51.4163062],[-2.4173188,51.4157923],[-2.4169153,51.4154176],[-2.4163651,51.4150468],[-2.4162841,51.4150058],[-2.4159287,51.414826],[-2.4155975,51.4145679],[-2.4150872,51.4142292],[-2.415013,51.4141585],[-2.4148001,51.413794],[-2.4146625,51.4136362],[-2.414027,51.413135],[-2.4139837,51.4130572],[-2.4140099,51.4130445],[-2.4140322,51.4130322],[-2.4140335,51.4130252],[-2.4140276,51.4130072],[-2.4140096,51.4129878],[-2.4139657,51.4129652],[-2.4138407,51.4129351],[-2.4137802,51.4129248],[-2.4137124,51.4129352],[-2.4136546,51.4129668],[-2.4135466,51.4130441],[-2.4134788,51.4131063],[-2.4133706,51.4131693],[-2.4132763,51.4131877],[-2.413148,51.413191],[-2.4130699,51.4131874],[-2.4129617,51.4131551],[-2.4129449,51.4131418],[-2.4129387,51.4131221],[-2.4129435,51.4130984],[-2.4130017,51.4128496],[-2.4131652,51.4124142],[-2.4131782,51.4123486],[-2.4131546,51.4123129],[-2.4130644,51.4122672],[-2.4130297,51.4122348],[-2.4130294,51.4121902],[-2.4132151,51.4119949],[-2.4135155,51.4118068],[-2.4138464,51.4116251],[-2.4140696,51.4114931],[-2.4142073,51.4114143],[-2.4143677,51.4112796],[-2.4144163,51.4112288],[-2.4145042,51.4111304],[-2.4146998,51.4108684],[-2.414747,51.4107938],[-2.4147792,51.410735],[-2.4147871,51.4107194],[-2.4147588,51.410706],[-2.4147298,51.4106923],[-2.4147049,51.4106783],[-2.4147021,51.4106647],[-2.4147206,51.4106409],[-2.4148116,51.4105354],[-2.4149185,51.4103615],[-2.4150072,51.4101877],[-2.415144,51.4098879],[-2.4152104,51.4097734],[-2.4155715,51.4093131],[-2.4157276,51.4090776],[-2.4158408,51.4089237],[-2.4160937,51.4084165],[-2.4161996,51.4082367],[-2.4162604,51.4081525],[-2.4163109,51.4080562],[-2.4163262,51.4078986],[-2.4163254,51.407775],[-2.4162286,51.406992],[-2.4162024,51.4068672],[-2.4158694,51.4064465],[-2.4158048,51.4063469],[-2.4157619,51.4062202],[-2.4157279,51.4059825],[-2.4157792,51.4058007],[-2.4158233,51.4056947],[-2.4158959,51.4056308],[-2.4159416,51.4055683],[-2.4161594,51.405206],[-2.4163756,51.4048879],[-2.4164088,51.4048404],[-2.4164029,51.4048019],[-2.4162884,51.4046803],[-2.4140514,51.4033317],[-2.4136517,51.4031181],[-2.4133696,51.4029961],[-2.4125543,51.4026112],[-2.412171,51.4024574],[-2.4114864,51.40211],[-2.410684,51.4016743],[-2.4103872,51.4015278],[-2.4098994,51.4013272],[-2.4088295,51.4008466],[-2.408259,51.4005737],[-2.4078619,51.4004082],[-2.4067996,51.4000231],[-2.4064985,51.3998912],[-2.4062995,51.3997879],[-2.4061855,51.3997113],[-2.4060987,51.399596],[-2.4060269,51.3994592],[-2.4059578,51.3992507],[-2.4058988,51.3987012],[-2.4058465,51.3984345],[-2.4057591,51.3982727],[-2.4057046,51.3982256],[-2.4056197,51.3981945],[-2.4055528,51.3981177],[-2.4053857,51.3980269],[-2.4049364,51.3975353],[-2.4047289,51.3973948],[-2.4044734,51.3972291],[-2.4042755,51.3971088],[-2.4041081,51.3970149],[-2.4039203,51.3969323],[-2.4031925,51.3967201],[-2.4024372,51.3965541],[-2.4022165,51.3964659],[-2.402135,51.3964069],[-2.4020683,51.3962724],[-2.4018471,51.395951],[-2.4016247,51.3955635],[-2.4015774,51.3955064],[-2.4015125,51.3954609],[-2.4009618,51.3952795],[-2.4001738,51.3949479],[-2.3999165,51.3949252],[-2.3997264,51.3949608],[-2.399608,51.3949756],[-2.3991144,51.3950372],[-2.3975222,51.3951336],[-2.3973966,51.3951404],[-2.3972021,51.3951375],[-2.3936141,51.3952142],[-2.3935841,51.395221],[-2.3935544,51.3952051],[-2.3934806,51.3951335],[-2.3932886,51.3952279],[-2.3929967,51.3953924],[-2.3926918,51.3955382],[-2.3926138,51.3955666],[-2.3925681,51.3955832],[-2.3926012,51.3956674],[-2.3926014,51.3957259],[-2.3925526,51.3957715],[-2.392009,51.3960296],[-2.3916261,51.3962412],[-2.3915947,51.3962096],[-2.3914845,51.396237],[-2.3914057,51.3962451],[-2.3913065,51.3962367],[-2.3910471,51.3961816],[-2.3909607,51.3962575],[-2.3908998,51.3962306],[-2.3908268,51.3961984],[-2.390105,51.3958801],[-2.3900758,51.3958697],[-2.3898089,51.3957533],[-2.3897183,51.3957177],[-2.3894225,51.3956208],[-2.3893459,51.395601],[-2.3890605,51.3956259],[-2.3889825,51.3956291],[-2.3888227,51.3956003],[-2.388703,51.3955571],[-2.3884243,51.3952875],[-2.3884148,51.3952475],[-2.3884373,51.3951297],[-2.3884732,51.3950402],[-2.3874705,51.3954648],[-2.3871507,51.3956031],[-2.3866176,51.3958396],[-2.3861447,51.3960364],[-2.3860878,51.3960575],[-2.3859946,51.3960616],[-2.3854884,51.3963135],[-2.3854528,51.3962854],[-2.3853001,51.3963537],[-2.3852392,51.396398],[-2.3851259,51.3965337],[-2.3850876,51.396592],[-2.3850818,51.3966064],[-2.3850773,51.3966176],[-2.3850388,51.3966547],[-2.3847195,51.3968494],[-2.3846411,51.3968509],[-2.3845878,51.3968333],[-2.3845272,51.3967992],[-2.3844325,51.3967293],[-2.3843153,51.3966081],[-2.384245,51.3964505],[-2.3841614,51.3963302],[-2.3840361,51.3962218],[-2.3836246,51.3959387],[-2.3830604,51.3956049],[-2.3827684,51.39547],[-2.3826655,51.3954313],[-2.3825413,51.3954021],[-2.38242,51.3954044],[-2.3822071,51.3953087],[-2.3821742,51.3952928],[-2.3819721,51.3951953],[-2.3812787,51.3948607],[-2.3810245,51.3947679],[-2.3809862,51.3947579],[-2.3809178,51.3947492],[-2.380648,51.3947149],[-2.3802306,51.3946761],[-2.38012,51.3946738],[-2.3800123,51.3946597],[-2.3799902,51.3946568],[-2.3799692,51.394654],[-2.3790926,51.3945752],[-2.3789996,51.3945685],[-2.3789024,51.3945696],[-2.3788332,51.3945668],[-2.3785753,51.3945333],[-2.3785275,51.3945172],[-2.3785005,51.3944798],[-2.378474,51.3944399],[-2.3783976,51.3944186],[-2.3782284,51.3943871],[-2.3779124,51.3943203],[-2.3774994,51.3942001],[-2.3769287,51.3940339],[-2.3769217,51.3939983],[-2.3756613,51.393569],[-2.3754471,51.3935216],[-2.3751854,51.3934567],[-2.3755499,51.3927842],[-2.3756583,51.3927276],[-2.3760061,51.3921372],[-2.3760106,51.3920724],[-2.3759865,51.3920109],[-2.3759265,51.3919567],[-2.3758511,51.3918989],[-2.3757654,51.3918597],[-2.3756837,51.3918246],[-2.375605,51.3917935],[-2.3754671,51.3917533],[-2.3753267,51.3917217],[-2.3751907,51.3916987],[-2.3750551,51.3916895],[-2.3749374,51.3916897],[-2.374803,51.3917081],[-2.3747232,51.3917425],[-2.3734382,51.3907292],[-2.3731609,51.3904914],[-2.372888,51.3902415],[-2.3718776,51.3891739],[-2.3716896,51.3889268],[-2.3716001,51.3886871],[-2.3715673,51.3885621],[-2.3715401,51.3884782],[-2.371547,51.3884437],[-2.3714854,51.388442],[-2.3714856,51.3883953],[-2.3714891,51.3883609],[-2.3716042,51.388364],[-2.3716525,51.3882883],[-2.3716667,51.3881601],[-2.371646,51.3881381],[-2.371564,51.3880424],[-2.3715063,51.3879288],[-2.3714783,51.3878053],[-2.3715016,51.3876747],[-2.3715359,51.3875663],[-2.3716108,51.3874224],[-2.3717031,51.3872903],[-2.3718319,51.3871572],[-2.3720806,51.3869686],[-2.3722999,51.3868292],[-2.3727867,51.3865647],[-2.3729047,51.3864877],[-2.3729919,51.3864182],[-2.3730589,51.3863253],[-2.3730951,51.3862659],[-2.3731058,51.3861931],[-2.3730965,51.3861471],[-2.3730673,51.3861024],[-2.3730093,51.3860508],[-2.3729356,51.3860073],[-2.3728302,51.3859777],[-2.3726405,51.3859651],[-2.3721976,51.3860121],[-2.3720895,51.3860131],[-2.3719578,51.385993],[-2.3715896,51.3858816],[-2.3713496,51.385866],[-2.3706035,51.3858146],[-2.3705019,51.3860323],[-2.3704421,51.3861395],[-2.367578,51.3859118],[-2.3671654,51.3858963],[-2.367081,51.3858952],[-2.3670072,51.3859068],[-2.36699,51.3859204],[-2.36682,51.3863276],[-2.3668024,51.3863831],[-2.3667962,51.3864392],[-2.3660351,51.3863078],[-2.3645384,51.3860443],[-2.3645559,51.3859713],[-2.364546,51.3858978],[-2.3645092,51.3858277],[-2.3644476,51.3857647],[-2.3643645,51.3857122],[-2.3642642,51.3856731],[-2.3641522,51.3856495],[-2.3640345,51.3856426],[-2.3639173,51.3856528],[-2.3635339,51.3846757],[-2.3634745,51.3845585],[-2.3634161,51.3843986],[-2.3631864,51.3838195],[-2.3629832,51.3832453],[-2.3629832,51.3832242],[-2.362988,51.3831904],[-2.3629443,51.3831836],[-2.3629003,51.3831748],[-2.3628575,51.3831641],[-2.3628209,51.3831841],[-2.3622117,51.3832756],[-2.3621808,51.3832766],[-2.3621539,51.3832706],[-2.3621341,51.3832594],[-2.362121,51.3832294],[-2.361272,51.3833446],[-2.3612022,51.383254],[-2.3611403,51.3831928],[-2.3610091,51.3830933],[-2.3610007,51.3830721],[-2.3609708,51.3829626],[-2.3608044,51.3826311],[-2.3606981,51.3825929],[-2.3605747,51.3822861],[-2.3605384,51.382135],[-2.360417,51.3815207],[-2.3604098,51.3814083],[-2.3603425,51.3812367],[-2.3602429,51.3812553],[-2.3598553,51.3813109],[-2.3594749,51.3813684]]}}]}"... it is necessary to trace the history of the project to date.  Following the passing of the National Parks and Access to the Countryside Act of 1949, which made provision for the designation and creation of long distance paths, I put forward the idea of a footpath route following the Cotswold escarpment.  This met with great interest but the plans which the Gloucestershire Committee of the Ramblers Association submitted to the National Parks Commission in 1953, though acknowledged and mentioned in the Commission's annual report of that year, was nevertheless pigeonholed and largely forgotten until Gloucestershire County Council prepared its recreational plan for the countryside in 1968.  The County Council decided to designate a Cotswold Way route itself, using existing public rights of way, and the scheme was launched during Footpath Week in May 1970.  The Way has had priority in signposting and waymarking programmes but until the
Countryside Commission get ministerial approval to create a national route, grants will not be available for maintenance and several very desirable rights of way, where none now exist are unlikely to be created."

A memorial to Trenfield in the form of a bench is on the Way near Dyrham Park.

Views

As it closely follows the scarp of the Cotswold Edge, the Cotswold Way usually affords views, mainly to the north and west—starting in the south with the Severn Estuary and Severn bridges, the meanders of the River Severn above Sharpness, the Forest of Dean, the Welsh hills of Monmouthshire and the Black Mountains on the Welsh border to the west. The distinctive shape of May Hill is visible for much of the route, as is the long spine of the Malvern Hills. Gloucester Cathedral can be seen from the path.

Further north on the path, above Cheltenham, there are old quarries containing rock features such as the Devil's Chimney at Leckhampton. After Cleeve Hill the escarpment starts to turn to the east, giving views across the Vale of Evesham. The classic Cotswold villages of Stanton and Stanway are visited, then Broadway village, before the final steep ascent to Broadway Tower and the scenic descent to Chipping Campden.

On a clear day, the Clee Hills near Ludlow can be seen,  to the northwest.

Places of interest

The  trail runs northeast from Bath to Chipping Campden, through or near to the following towns: Old Sodbury, near Chipping Sodbury, Wotton-under-Edge, Dursley, Stroud, Painswick, Cranham, Leckhampton, Cheltenham, Winchcombe, Stanway and Broadway.

It passes numerous places of interest, including the site of the Battle of Lansdowne, the Somerset Monument, the Tyndale Monument, Sudeley Castle, Cleeve Hill, Hailes Abbey, and the Broadway Tower. With the exception of a small stretch around Broadway (which is in Worcestershire), the entire walk is within Gloucestershire (including South Gloucestershire) and Somerset (including Bath and North East Somerset).

Other recreational use
Besides being popular with walkers, the Cotswold Way is run annually as a 10-stage relay (the Cotswold Way Relay) from north to south, usually in late June or early July. The winning team typically takes an aggregate time of about 12 hours. It is run under Fell Runners' Association rules and organised by City of Bath Athletic Club. It is traditional for the first leg to start from St James Church, Chipping Campden promptly at 7am. The lead runners finish the final leg outside the doors of Bath Abbey at about 6pm.
In September, the Cotswold Way is run as a single stage race from north to south, leaving Chipping Campden at noon on a Saturday and finishing in Bath from approximately 6am until 6pm the following day in front of Bath Abbey.  The race is organised by Cotswold Running.
The official record for running the Costwold Way is held by Nathan Montegue of Swindon Harriers, who on 24 September 2014 ran from Chipping Campden to Bath in 19 hours and 31 minutes.

Route and points of interest

See also
Long-distance footpaths in the United Kingdom

References

External links

 Cotswold Way Official National Trail Cotswold Way website
 Cotswold Way route relation on OpenStreetMap
 Map of the Cotswold Way indicated in 2 mile sections
 Wall Street Journal article
 The Walking Englishman
 Review of the Cotswold Way
 Pictures, interactive map, and detailed information about the trail characteristics and suitability

Long-distance footpaths in England
Footpaths in Gloucestershire
Cotswolds